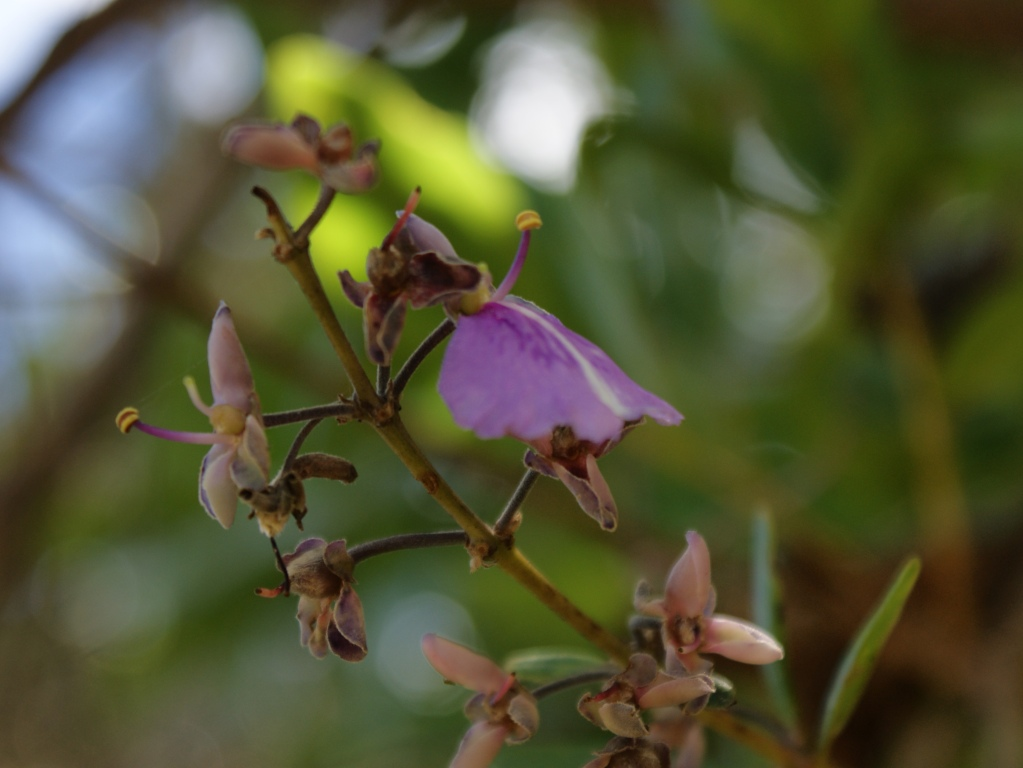

Scientific classification
- Kingdom: Plantae
- Clade: Tracheophytes
- Clade: Angiosperms
- Clade: Eudicots
- Clade: Rosids
- Order: Myrtales
- Family: Vochysiaceae
- Genus: Qualea
- Species: Q. parviflora

Binomial name
- Qualea parviflora Mart.

= Qualea parviflora =

Species of tree

Qualea parviflora, known as pau-terra in Portuguese, is a deciduous tree indigenous to Bolivia, Brazil, and Paraguay. The tree favors dry climates like the tropical savanna of the cerrado.

== Description ==
Qualea parviflora grows up to 8 m (26 ft) tall. It flowers between September and December. Each flower has one light purple petal, a single stamen, a spurred calyx, and a three-parted ovary. Pau-terra can be distinguished from a close relative Qualea multiflora by its smaller flowers.

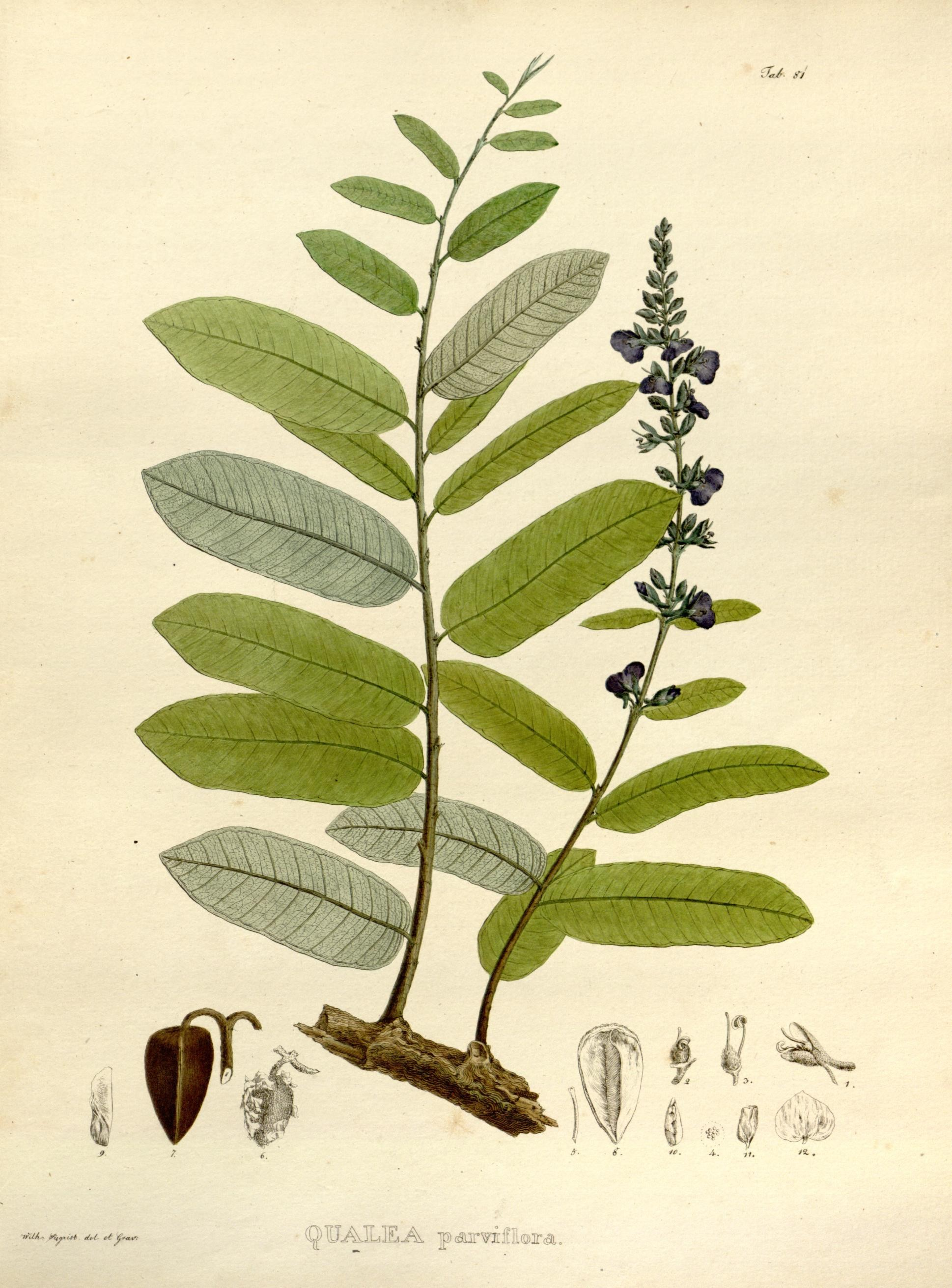
Illustration from Karl Friedrich Philipp von Martius's Nova genera et species plantarum

== Ecology ==
The flowers are pollinated by bees. The seeds are eaten by buprestid beetles and small Hymenoptera species. Caterpillars of the dalcerid moth Dalcera abrasa feed on Quaela parviflora.
