= Arrayán =

Arrayán may refer to:

- Arrayán (TV series), a series aired on Canal Sur (Spain) from 2001 to 2013
- Myrtus communis or common myrtle, an evergreen shrub in Spain
- Luma apiculata or Chilean myrtle, a flowering shrub in Argentina and Chile
- Qualea ingens or Vochysiaceae tree, a flowering plant in Colombia
