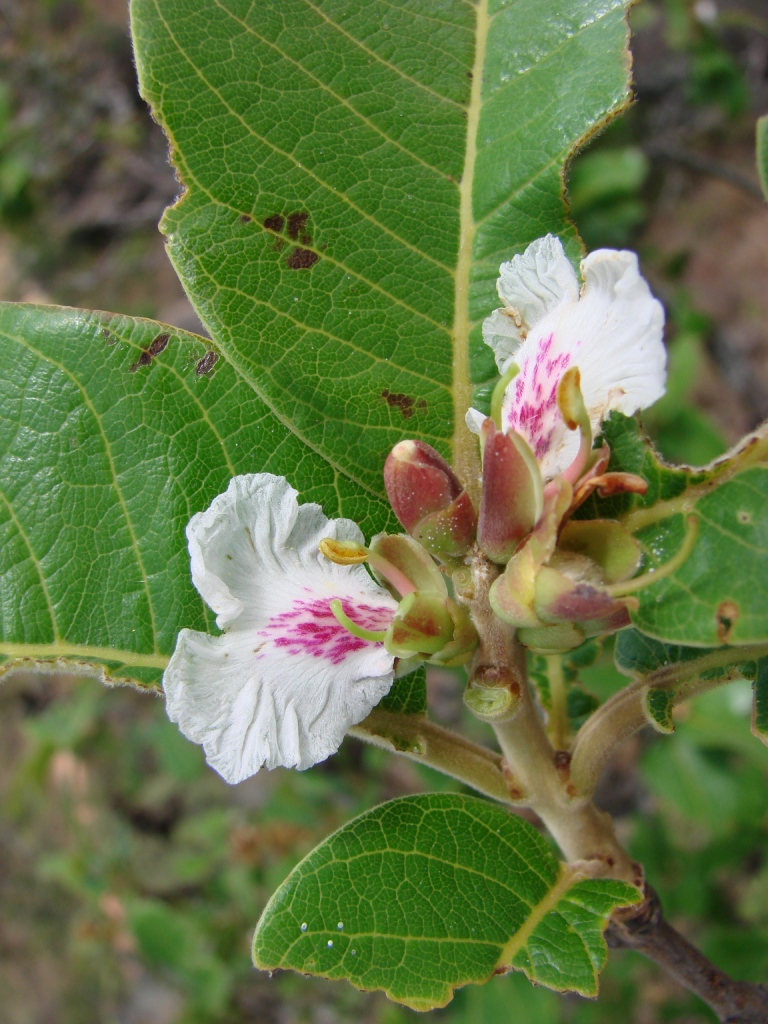

Scientific classification
- Kingdom: Plantae
- Clade: Tracheophytes
- Clade: Angiosperms
- Clade: Eudicots
- Clade: Rosids
- Order: Myrtales
- Family: Vochysiaceae
- Genus: Qualea
- Species: Q. cordata
- Variety: Q. c. var. dichotoma

Trinomial name
- Qualea cordata var. dichotoma (Mart.) M.Lisboa & K.Yamam. (2009)

Synonyms
- Amphilochia dichotoma Mart. (1826) (basionym); Qualea dichotoma (Mart.) Warm. ex Wille

= Qualea cordata var. dichotoma =

Species of tree

Qualea cordata var. dichotoma (synonym Qualea dichotoma), also known as jacaré, is a deciduous tree indigenous to central and eastern Brazil. It is a common ornamental plant, used in landscaping, street planting, and gardens.

== Description ==
Qualea cordata var. dichotoma is a deciduous tree that can grow 10–18 m (33–59 ft) in height. The tree grows 40–50 cm (16–20 in) in diameter, and has a thick, corky bark. The plant grows well in sunny areas with poor or sandy soil where water drains quickly. The leaves are ovate, and are arranged opposite on the stem, and the flowers are small and range from white to violet. The seeds are a light brown and the seed capsule splits into two.

== Habitat ==
Qualea cordata var. dichotoma is native to Brazil, and can be found in rainforests, but is more commonly found in dry, sunny areas with sparse vegetation, such as savannahs.

== Uses ==
Qualea cordata var. dichotoma is used prominently as decoration in Brazil, as either a garden element or as a part of landscaping. It is also used as a replenisher for low-nutrient soils. Qualea dichotoma has wood with low durability and low hardness, but is still used in constructions of low-quality tables, chairs, ceilings, and floors.
