= Vochysia aurifera =

Conservation status
- Critically Endangered (IUCN 2.3)

Scientific classification
- Kingdom: Plantae
- Clade: Tracheophytes
- Clade: Angiosperms
- Clade: Eudicots
- Clade: Rosids
- Order: Myrtales
- Family: Vochysiaceae
- Genus: Vochysia
- Species: V. aurifera

Binomial name
- Vochysia aurifera Standl. & L.O. Williams

Species of flowering plant

Vochysia aurifera is a species of plant in the Vochysiaceae family. It is endemic to Honduras, in Central America.
