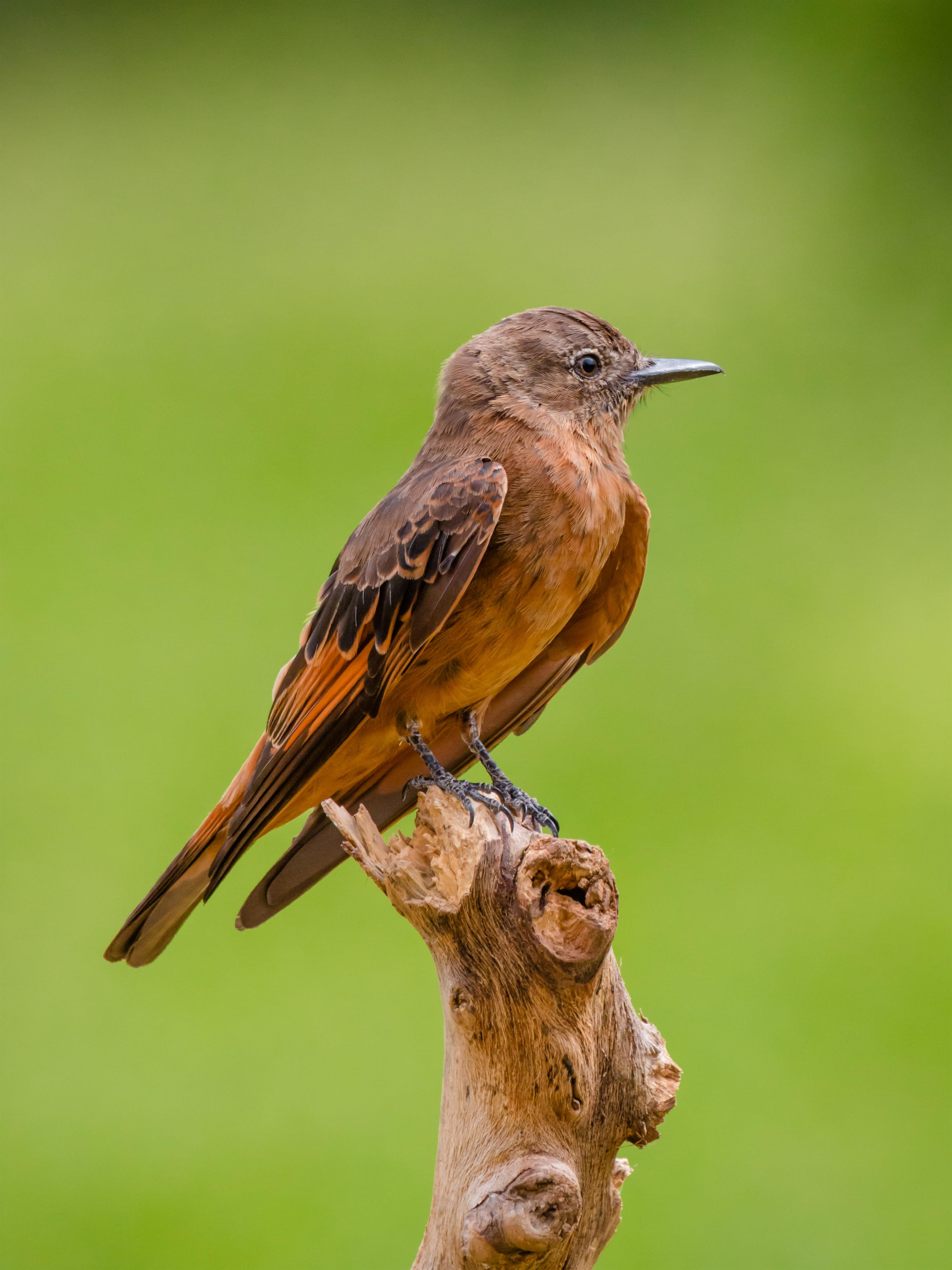
- H. f. bellicosa in Pindamonhangaba, São Paulo, Brazil

Conservation status
- Least Concern (IUCN 3.1)

- Least Concern (IUCN 3.1)

Scientific classification
- Kingdom: Animalia
- Phylum: Chordata
- Class: Aves
- Order: Passeriformes
- Family: Tyrannidae
- Genus: Hirundinea d'Orbigny & Lafresnaye, 1837
- Species: H. ferruginea

Binomial name
- Hirundinea ferruginea (Gmelin, JF, 1788)

Synonyms
- Hirundinea bellicosa (in part)(Vieillot, 1819)

= Cliff flycatcher =

Species of bird

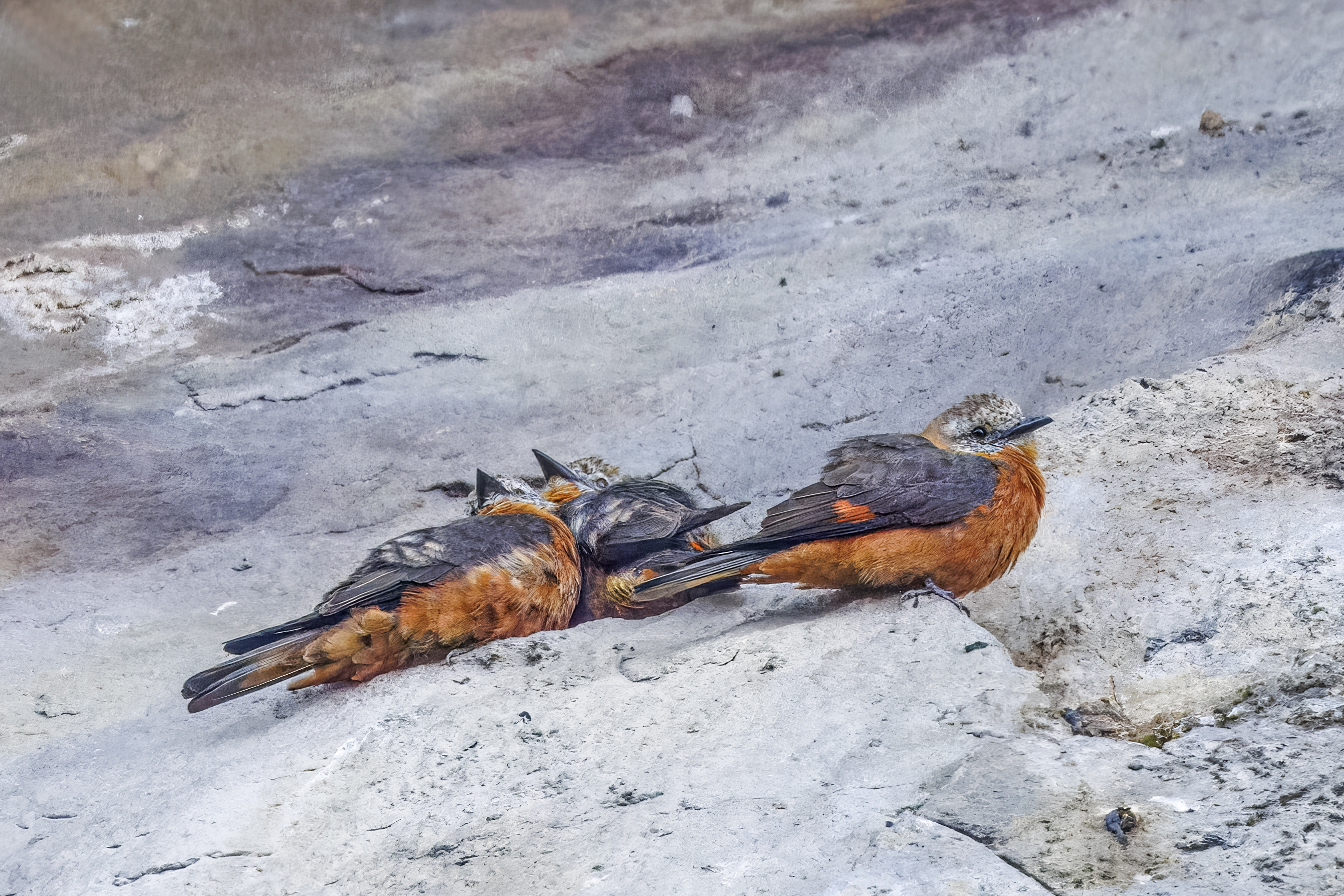
H. f. sclateri on the cliifs above Loreto Road in Ecuador

The cliff flycatcher (Hirundinea ferruginea) is a species of bird in the family Tyrannidae, the tyrant flycatchers. It is known in every mainland South American country except Chile and may occur there as well.

== Taxonomy and systematics ==
The cliff flycatcher was formally described in 1788 by the German naturalist Johann Friedrich Gmelin in his revised and expanded edition of Carl Linnaeus's Systema Naturae. He placed it with the todies in the genus Todus and coined the binomial name Todus ferrugineus. Gmelin based his description on the "ferruginous bellied tody" from Cayenne that had been described in 1782 by the English ornithologist John Latham in his book A General Synopsis of Birds. Latham had access to a specimen in the Leverian Museum in London. The cliff flycatcher is the only species in the genus Hirundinea that was introduced in 1837 by the French naturalists Alcide d'Orbigny and Frédéric de Lafresnaye The genus name Hirundinea is Latin meaning "of swallows"; the specific epithet ferruginea is Latin meaning "rusty-colored" or "ferruginous".

The cliff flycatcher's further taxonomy is unsettled. The International Ornithological Congress, the South American Classification Committee of the American Ornithological Society (SACC), and the Clements taxonomy assign it these four subspecies:

- H. f. ferruginea (Gmelin, JF, 1788)
- H. f. sclateri Reinhardt, 1870
- H. f. bellicosa (Vieillot, 1819)
- H. f. pallidior Hartert, EJO & Goodson, 1917

However, since 2016 BirdLife International's Handbook of the Birds of the World (HBW) assigns only H. f. ferruginea and H. f. sclateri to the cliff flycatcher and separates H. f. bellicosa and H. f. pallidior as the "swallow flycatcher" (H. bellicosa). The Clements taxonomy recognizes the "cliff" and "swallow" groups within the single species.

This article follows the one species, four subspecies, model.

== Description ==
The cliff flycatcher is 15.5 to 18.5 cm (6.1 to 7.3 in) long and weighs 21 to 42 g (0.74 to 1.5 oz). The sexes have the same plumage. Adults of the nominate subspecies H. f. ferruginea have a brown crown and sides of the head, grayish forehead and ear coverts, a whitish supercilium, and a dark line through the eye. Their upperparts are brown. Their primary wing coverts are blackish brown with bright orange bases. Their secondary coverts and tertials are dark brown. Their primaries and secondaries are mostly orange with dark brown tips that extend up the outer webs of most of them. Their tail is brown to sooty black. Their chin is mottled with brownish to gray and their throat and underparts are rich cinnamon-rufous. Juveniles are similar to adults but paler and duller overall.

The other subspecies of the cliff flycatcher differ from the nominate and each other thus:

- H. f. sclateri: bright tawny to rufous inner web of most tail feathers; more gray mottling on the face and a paler chin than nominate
- H. f. bellicosa: minimal grayish on face, dusky mottling on cheeks and chin, mostly rufous-brown upperparts with orange-brown rump, uppertail coverts, and base of tail, and more rufous edging on wing feathers than nominate
- H. f. pallidior: paler overall than nominate, with wider tawny-rufous edges on wing coverts

All subspecies have a brownish olive to yellowish olive iris, a black bill with a wide base, and slate to blackish legs and feet.

== Distribution and habitat ==
The cliff flycatcher has a highly disjunct distribution. The subspecies are found thus:

- H. f. ferruginea: from southeastern Colombia east across southern Venezuela and northwestern Brazil into Guyana; also eastern Suriname and French Guiana
- H. f. sclateri: Andes of western Venezuela, in the Serranía del Perijá on the Venezuela-Colombia border, in the isolated Sierra Nevada de Santa Marta in northern Colombia, and intermittently from Colombia's Central and Eastern Andes south on the eastern Andean slope through Ecuador into Peru as far as Cuzco Department
- H. f. bellicosa: eastern and southern Brazil from southern Pará east to the Atlantic and south to eastern Bolivia, eastern Paraguay, Misiones Province in northeastern Argentina, and much of Uruguay
- H. f. pallidior: across central Bolivia into western Paraguay and south in western Argentina to Mendoza and San Luis provinces

In addition, the SACC has unconfirmed records in Chile that lead it to classify the species as hypothetical in that country.

The cliff flycatcher inhabits vertical landscapes near or within forest including cliffs and gorges, canyons, rocky outcrops, quarries, and road cuttings. In the southern parts of its range it also utilizes human structures such as buildings and bridges, and in eastern Brazil is found in Eremanthus forest and campo rupestre. In elevation it occurs from sea level to 2,000 m (6,600 ft) in Brazil. In Venezuela it ranges between 1,000 and 2,500 m (3,300 and 8,200 ft) north of the Orinoco River and between 100 and 1,900 m (300 and 6,200 ft) south of it. It reaches 1,600 m (5,200 ft) in Colombia, ranges between 900 and 1,700 m (3,000 and 5,600 ft) in Ecuador, and mostly ranges from 400 to 2,200 m (1,300 to 7,200 ft) but locally to 2,700 m (8,900 ft) in Peru. It reaches 3,900 m (12,800 ft) in Bolivia and 3,500 m (11,500 ft) in Argentina.

== Behavior ==
=== Movement ===
The cliff flycatcher is a year-round resident in most of its range but moves north from Argentina, Uruguay, and far southern Brazil in the austral winter. Some wandering, but not true migration, has been noted in northern populations.

=== Feeding ===
The cliff flycatcher feeds on insects, though details are lacking. It typically forages in pairs or family groups. It perches horizontally on an exposed perch such as a cliff face, the end of a branch, and in urban areas a utility wire or building. It captures prey in mid-air with whooping and gliding swallow-like sallies from the perch ("hawking") and usually returns to the same perch. It is "notably fearless of humans". "Bill snapping when catching insects may be audible at quite some distance."

=== Breeding ===
The cliff flycatcher's breeding season varies geographically but has not been fully defined. Most of the breeding data are from the two southern "swallow flycatcher" subspecies. All known nests are open cups made from soft plant material, moss, and twigs with feathers, hair, and dead leaves sometimes incorporated. The species nests on ledges and in crevices on natural cliffs and road cuts and on window ledges in urban areas. Two nests were between 10 and 12 m (35 and 40 ft) up, one on a 14 m (45 ft) high cliff and the other in a road cut. The clutch size is two or three eggs that are white with a yellowish or pinkish tinge and darker speckles. The incubation period and time to fledging are not known. Both parents defend the nest with distraction displays but other details of parental care are not known.

=== Vocalization ===
The "cliff" and "swallow" groups of the cliff flycatcher have different vocalizations. The northern and Andean "cliff" flycatchers sing "a two note ti-wee or ki-lee". They also make "single pip calls". The southern "swallow" flycatchers sing a "loose series of short phrases uttered at a leisurely pace [like] a two note prrr-wheu. The call of both populations is a "long overslurred whistle followed by a variable number of short trilled notes whee-trrrrr", though that of the southern birds is lower pitched and faster. The species sings from a perch, usually near dawn and in late afternoon but intermittently during the day. The call is dominant during most of the day.

== Status ==
The IUCN follows HBW taxonomy and so has separately assessed the "cliff" and "swallow" flycatchers. Both are assessed as being of Least Concern. Both have very large ranges and unknown population sizes. The population of the "cliff" flycatcher is believed to be increasing and that of the "swallow" flycatcher stable. No immediate threats to either have been identified. The cliff flycatcher is considered "local" in Venezuela and Ecuador, "very local" in Colombia, and "locally fairly common" in Peru. It is considered fairly common in the southern part of its range and occurs in many protected areas throughout South America.
