= Mahechadendron =

Scientific classification
- Kingdom: Plantae
- Clade: Tracheophytes
- Clade: Angiosperms
- Clade: Eudicots
- Clade: Rosids
- Order: Myrtales
- Family: Vochysiaceae
- Genus: Mahechadendron; W.Ariza, Cortés-Ballén & Fern.Alonso
- Species: M. puntecascarillo

Binomial name
- Mahechadendron puntecascarillo W.Ariza, Cortés-Ballén & Fern.Alonso

Genus of flowering plants

Mahechadendron is a genus of flowering plants in the family Vochysiaceae. It includes a single species, Mahechadendron puntecascarillo, a tree native to tropical moist forests along the middle Magdalena River in Colombia. The tree produces highly durable wood which is used intensively for construction.

The species was described in 2022. Specimens were first collected in the 1960s but wasn't described until flowers and fruits were collected. It is likely most closely related to Callisthene. The authors suggest that the species is endangered.
