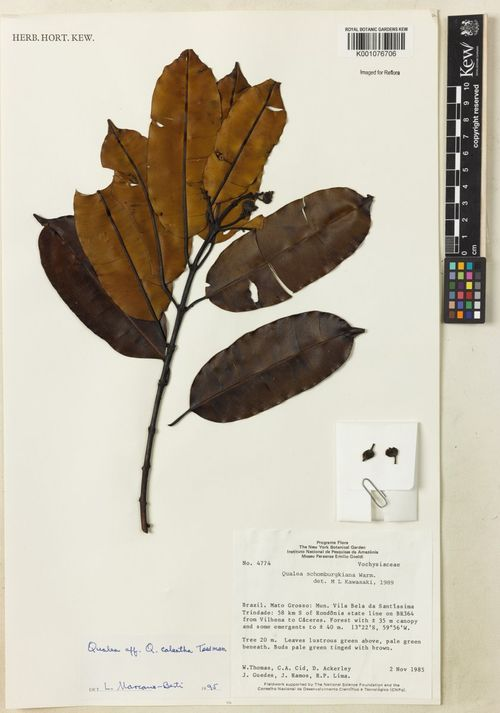

Conservation status
- Data Deficient (IUCN 3.1)

Scientific classification
- Kingdom: Plantae
- Clade: Tracheophytes
- Clade: Angiosperms
- Clade: Eudicots
- Clade: Rosids
- Order: Myrtales
- Family: Vochysiaceae
- Genus: Qualea
- Species: Q. calantha

Binomial name
- Qualea calantha Pilg.

= Qualea calantha =

Species of plant

Qualea calantha is a species of tree in the Vochysiaceae family. It is endemic to Peru.

It is found in the Amazon Basin region of eastern Peru.

The species was described in 1931.
