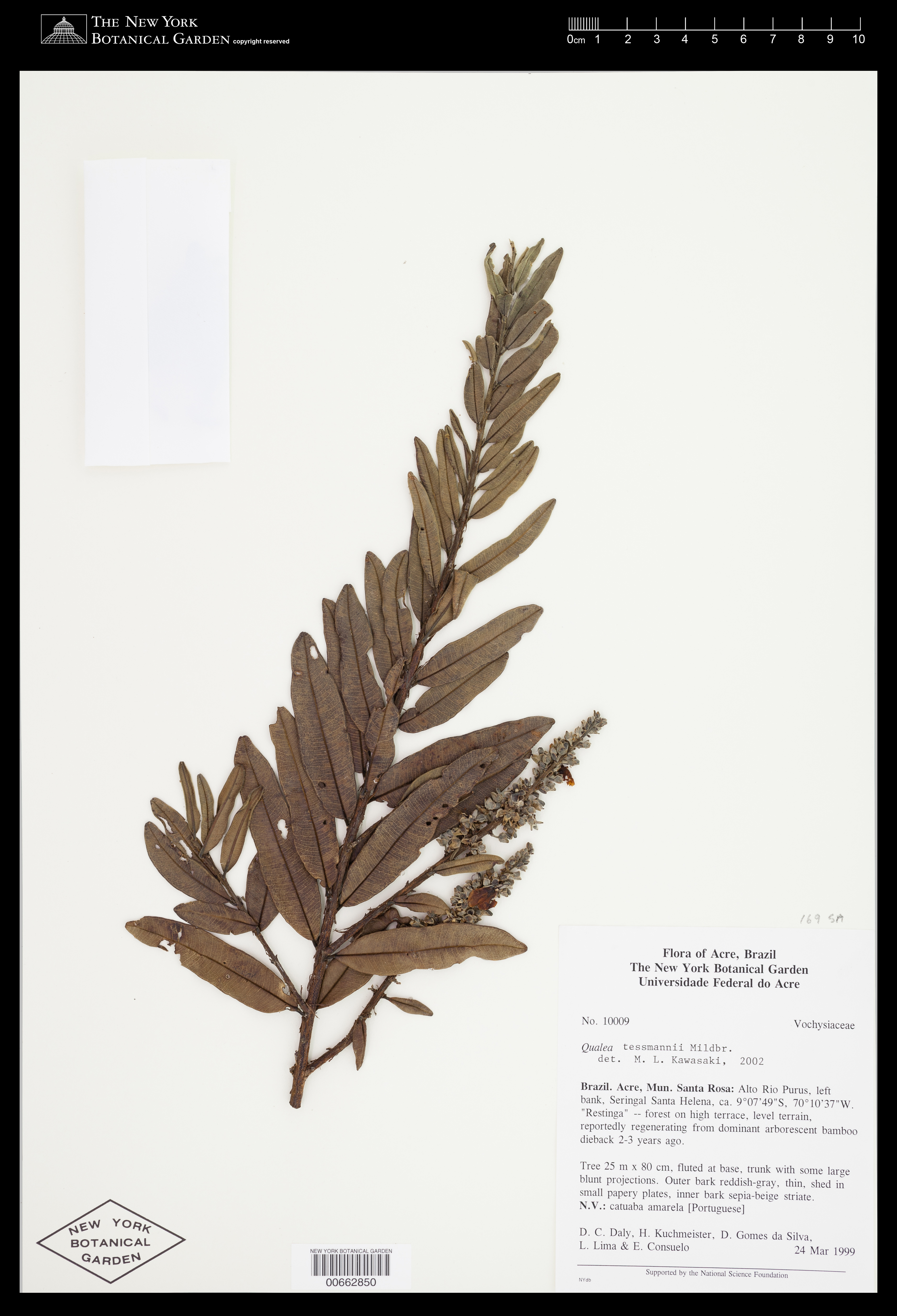

Conservation status
- Least Concern (IUCN 3.1)

Scientific classification
- Kingdom: Plantae
- Clade: Embryophytes
- Clade: Tracheophytes
- Clade: Angiosperms
- Clade: Eudicots
- Clade: Rosids
- Order: Myrtales
- Family: Vochysiaceae
- Genus: Qualea
- Species: Q. tessmannii

Binomial name
- Qualea tessmannii Mildbr.

= Qualea tessmannii =

Species of tree

Qualea tessmannii is a species of tree that is part of the family Vochysiaceae. It mainly grows In wet tropical climates and can be found in countries like Brazil, Bolivia, and Peru.
