= B. balansae =

B. balansae may refer to:

- Balanops balansae, a plant species endemic to New Caledonia
- Beauprea balansae, a plant species endemic to New Caledonia
- Bromelia balansae, a plant species native to Argentina, Brazil and Paraguay

== See also ==
- Balansae
