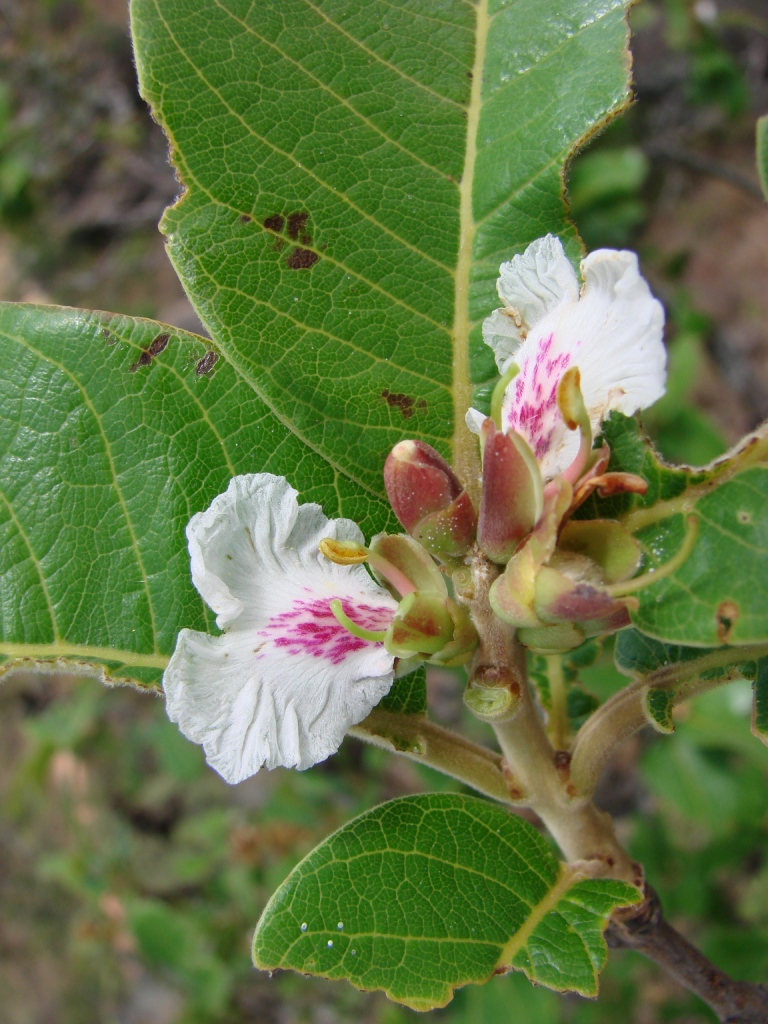
- Qualea cordata var. dichotoma

Scientific classification
- Kingdom: Plantae
- Clade: Tracheophytes
- Clade: Angiosperms
- Clade: Eudicots
- Clade: Rosids
- Order: Myrtales
- Family: Vochysiaceae
- Genus: Qualea
- Species: Q. cordata

Binomial name
- Qualea cordata Spreng.

Varieties
- Qualea cordata var. cordata; Qualea cordata var. dichotoma (Mart.) M.Lisboa & K.Yamam.; Qualea cordata var. elongata (Warm.) T.Samp. & A.M.Teles; Qualea cordata var. grandifolia Warm.; Qualea cordata var. intermedia (Warm.) Stafleu

= Qualea cordata =

Species of flowering plant

Qualea cordata is a species of flowering plant in the family Vochysiaceae. It is a shrub or tree native to eastern, central, and southern Brazil, eastern Bolivia, Paraguay, and Misiones Province of northeastern Argentina. Five varieties are accepted. Var. dichotoma is known as jacaré and is popular street and garden tree in Brazil.

== Varieties ==
Five varieties are accepted.

- Qualea cordata var. cordata (synonyms Amphilochia cordata Mart. and Qualea cordata f. rupestris Hassl.) – eastern Bolivia, Paraguay, northeastern Argentina (Misiones), and eastern, southern, and west-central Brazil
- Qualea cordata var. dichotoma (Mart.) M.Lisboa & K.Yamam. (synonyms Amphilochia dichotoma Mart. and Qualea dichotoma (Mart.) Warm. ex Wille) – eastern Bolivia and eastern, southern, and west-central Brazil
- Qualea cordata var. elongata (Warm.) T.Samp. & A.M.Teles (synonyms Qualea dichotoma var. elongata (Warm.) Stafleu, Qualea elongata Warm., and Qualea glauca Warm.) - southeastern and west-central Brazil
- Qualea cordata var. grandifolia Warm. – southeastern Brazil (Minas Gerais)
- Qualea cordata var. intermedia (Warm.) Stafleu – eastern Brazil
