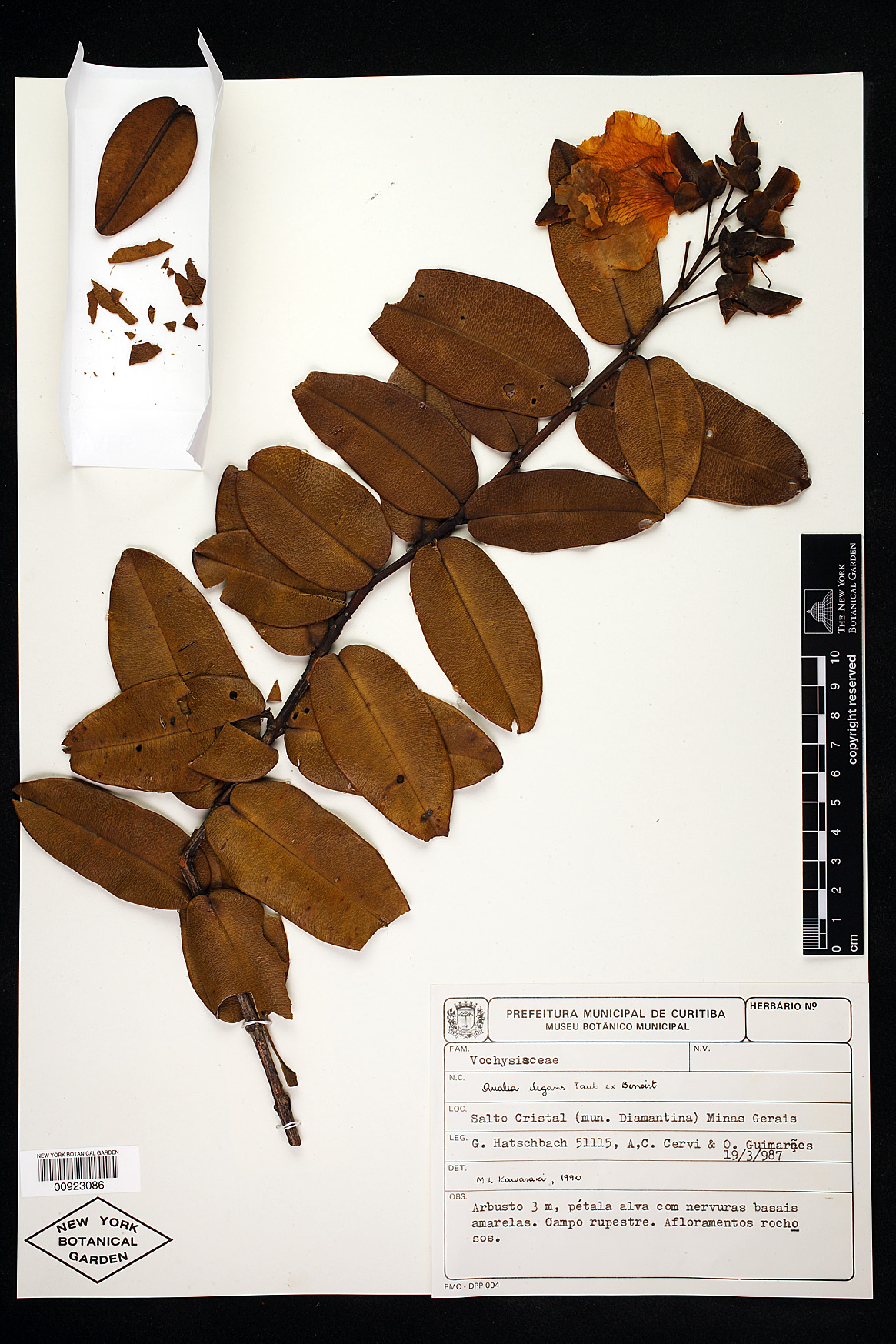

Scientific classification
- Kingdom: Plantae
- Clade: Tracheophytes
- Clade: Angiosperms
- Clade: Eudicots
- Clade: Rosids
- Order: Myrtales
- Family: Vochysiaceae
- Genus: Qualea
- Species: Q. elegans

Binomial name
- Qualea elegans Taub. ex Benoist, 1915

Synonyms
- Qualea elegans Taub. ex Glaz., 1905

= Qualea elegans =

Species of flowering plant

Qualea elegans is a species of flowering plants in the family Vochysiaceae. It is found in Brazil.
