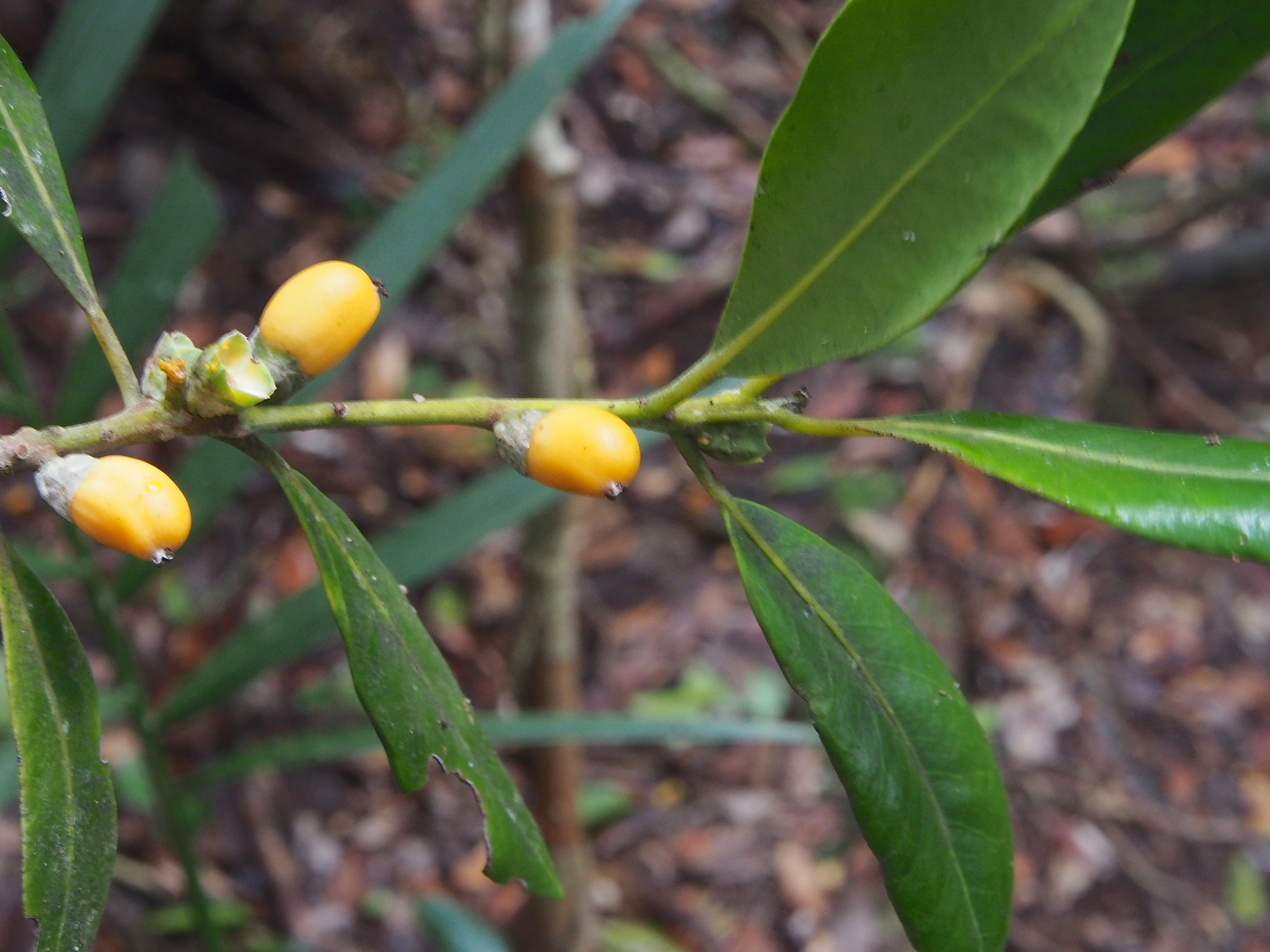
- Balanops australiana

Scientific classification
- Kingdom: Plantae
- Clade: Tracheophytes
- Clade: Angiosperms
- Clade: Eudicots
- Clade: Rosids
- Order: Malpighiales
- Family: Balanopaceae
- Genus: Balanops; Baill.

Species
- See text

Synonyms
- Ternstroemiacearum Seem.; Trilocularia Schltr.

= Balanops =

Genus of flowering plants

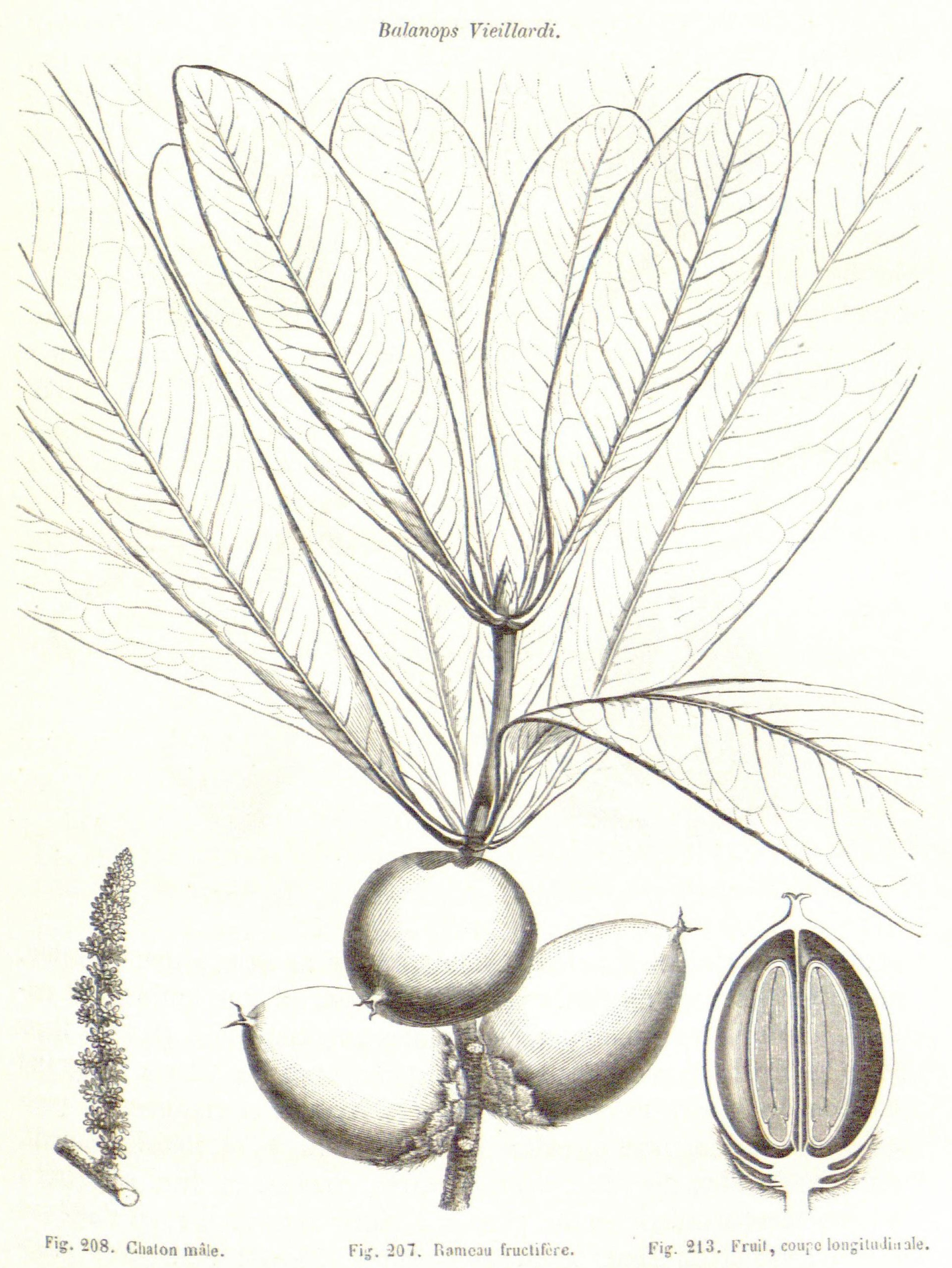
Balanops vieillardii line drawing

Balanops is a group of flowering plants described as a genus in 1871. The nine species are trees or shrubs, found northeast Queensland, Australia, and the South Pacific islands of New Caledonia, Fiji and Vanuatu. Plants in this genus are dioecious, with male and female flowers produced on separate plants.

Balanops is the sole genus in the family Balanopaceae (formerly the spelling Balanopsidaceae was also used). It is placed in the order Malpighiales and is most closely related to Chrysobalanaceae, Dichapetalaceae, Euphroniaceae and Trigoniaceae.

== Species ==
As of February 2026, Plants of the World Online accepts the following nine species:

- Balanops australiana – Queensland
- Balanops balansae – New Caledonia
- Balanops microstachya – New Caledonia
- Balanops oliviformis – New Caledonia
- Balanops pachyphylla – New Caledonia
- Balanops pancheri – New Caledonia
- Balanops pedicellata – Vanuatu, Fiji
- Balanops sparsifolia – New Caledonia
- Balanops vieillardii – New Caledonia
