= Korupodendron =

Conservation status
- Endangered (IUCN 3.1)

Scientific classification
- Kingdom: Plantae
- Clade: Tracheophytes
- Clade: Angiosperms
- Clade: Eudicots
- Clade: Rosids
- Order: Myrtales
- Family: Vochysiaceae
- Genus: Korupodendron; Litt & Cheek
- Species: K. songweanum

Binomial name
- Korupodendron songweanum Litt & Cheek

Genus of flowering plants

Korupodendron is a monotypic genus of flowering plants in the family Vochysiaceae. The genus is represented by the single species Korupodendron songweanum. It was first discovered in Korup National Park in northwestern Cameroon and named in honor of Dr N. Songwe. Korupodendron differs from the other African genus Erismadelphus by having three conspicuous and petaloid sepals and two inconspicuous sepals.

== Description ==
Korupodendron songweanum is a tall canopy tree species, with opposite simple leaves; the leaf shape is elliptic to ovate, with an entire margin, acute to obtuse base and an acuminate apex, chartaceous, glabrous (dimensions: 8–12.5 x 4–6 cm).The sessile flowers are zygomorph with five white sepals fused at the base, and five free petals readily deciduous; the upper sepal forms a sac-like spur over the unilocular ovary;the only fertile stamen and the style are strait to slightly curved; fruits indehiscent with three large wings and two smaller ones.

== Ecology ==
The species' natural habitat is wet upland tropical rain forest.

== Distribution ==
Since its discovery in Cameroon, more populations of the tree have been found in Equatorial Guinea and Gabon.
