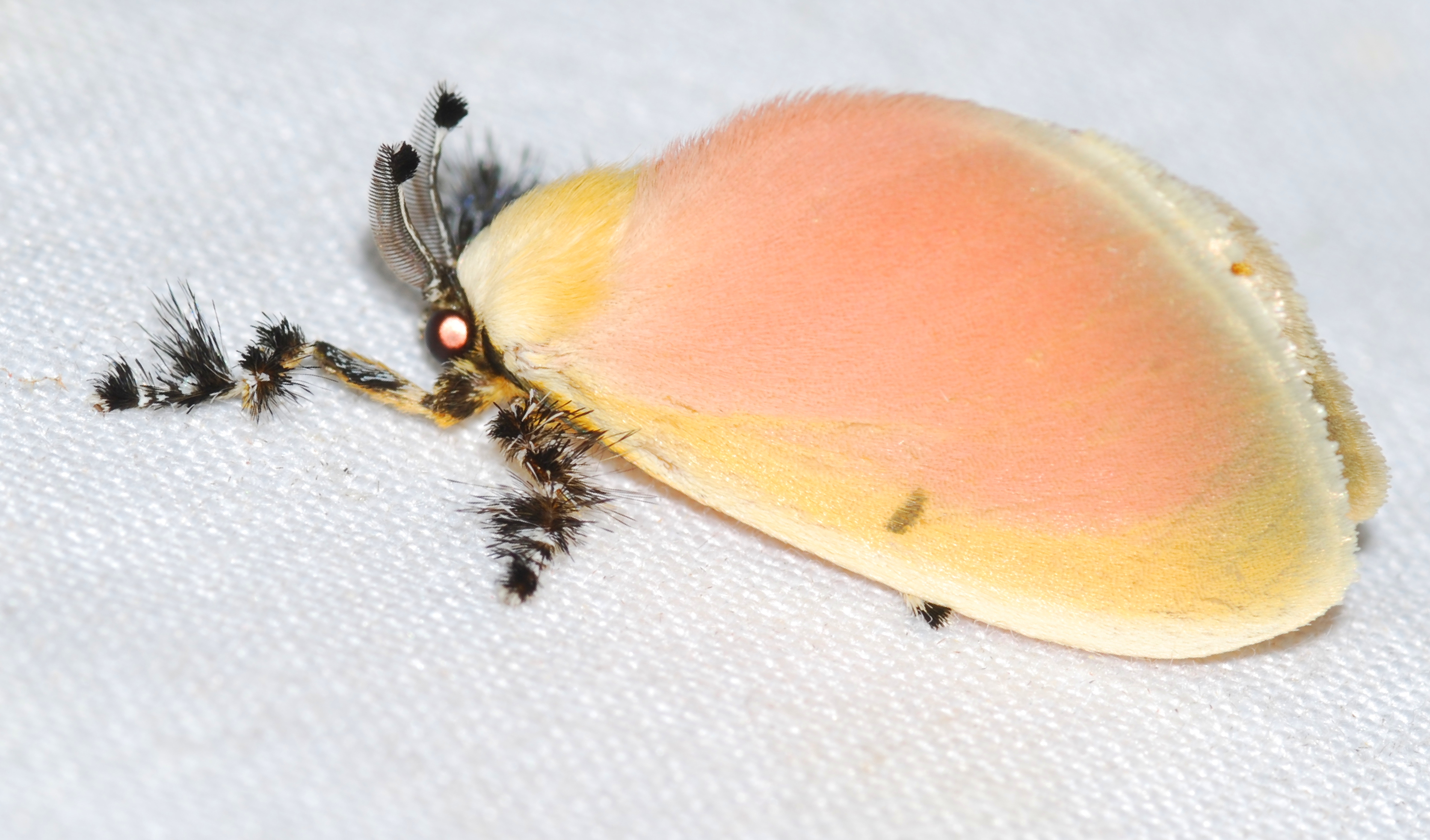
- Dalcera abrasa

Scientific classification
- Domain: Eukaryota
- Kingdom: Animalia
- Phylum: Arthropoda
- Class: Insecta
- Order: Lepidoptera
- Family: Dalceridae
- Subfamily: Dalcerinae
- Genus: Dalcera; Herrich-Schäffer, 1854

= Dalcera =

Genus of moths

Dalcera is a genus of moths of the family Dalceridae with four Neotropical species. The larva of one species, D. abrasa, is a pest of coffee.

== Species ==
- Dalcera abrasa
  - Recorded food plants: Coffea, Eremanthus glomerulatus, Erythroxylum deciduum, Metrodorea pubescens, Ouratea hexasperma, Pouteria ramiflora, Qualea parviflora
- Dalcera canescens
- Dalcera haywardi
- Dalcera semirufa
