= Qualea impexa =

Conservation status
- Critically Endangered (IUCN 3.1)

Scientific classification
- Kingdom: Plantae
- Clade: Tracheophytes
- Clade: Angiosperms
- Clade: Eudicots
- Clade: Rosids
- Order: Myrtales
- Family: Vochysiaceae
- Genus: Qualea
- Species: Q. impexa

Binomial name
- Qualea impexa J.F.Macbr.

Species of plant

Qualea impexa is a species of flowering plant in the Vochysiaceae family. It is a tree endemic to Peru. It is known only from Loreto Department in the Amazon Basin of northeastern Peru. It grows in lowland Amazon rainforest at 100 metres elevation.

The species was described by James Francis Macbride in 1931.
