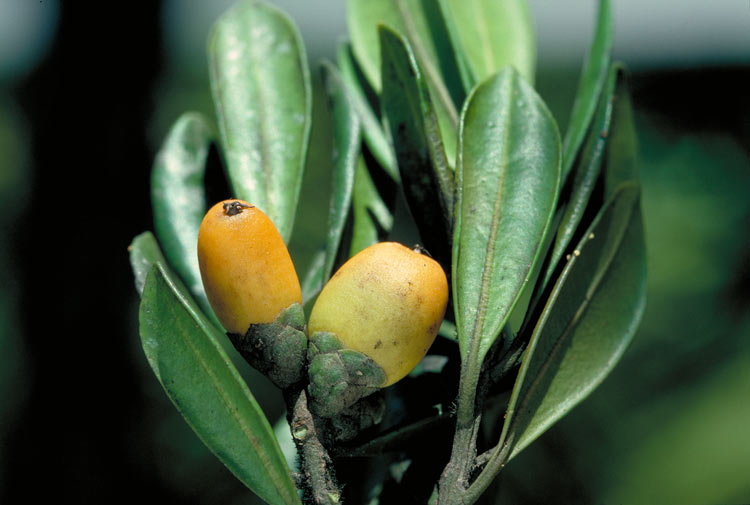
- Ripening fruit

Conservation status
- Least Concern (IUCN 3.1)

Scientific classification
- Kingdom: Plantae
- Clade: Tracheophytes
- Clade: Angiosperms
- Clade: Eudicots
- Clade: Rosids
- Order: Malpighiales
- Family: Balanopaceae
- Genus: Balanops
- Species: B. australiana

Binomial name
- Balanops australiana F.Muell.

Synonyms
- Balanops montana C.T.White

= Balanops australiana =

Pimplebark

Species of flowering plant

Balanops australiana, commonly known as pimplebark, is a plant in the family Balanopaceae found only in the coastal regions of northern and central Queensland, Australia.

== Description ==
Balanops australiana is a tree that may grow to be 35 m (115 ft) tall. The trunk is marked with conspicuous pale lenticels which are relatively large, and the roots of mature trees extend horizontally across the ground for some distance. The leaves are obovate to elliptic, are arranged alternately on the twigs and are held on petioles (stalks) between 5 and 10 mm (0.20 and 0.39 in) long. The leaves measure up to 9 cm (3.5 in) long by 5 cm (2.0 in) wide, and are somewhat thickened; the leaf edges are mostly entire (smooth), but small teeth may be present toward the apex.

The flowers are very small — the tepals (collectively, petals and sepals that are difficult to tell apart) are just 2–4 mm (0.08–0.16 in) long. Flowers are either male or female, and both are surrounded by densely hairy bracts. The fruit is a drupe which is obloid in shape (i.e. somewhat like a Rugby ball). It is yellow or orange, contains one or two seeds and measures about 15 mm (0.59 in) long by 8 mm (0.31 in) wide.

=== Phenology ===
Flowering occurs from December to January, and fruit ripen between August and May.

== Taxonomy ==
This species was first described in 1877 by the German-born Australian botanist Ferdinand von Mueller, based on a collection made by John Dallachy ad sinum maris (by the bay) at Rockingham Bay.

== Distribution and habitat ==
This species occurs in rainforests of coastal northeastern Queensland, from about Cooktown southwards to about Eungella. It grows on volcanic soils in rainforest, at altitudes from near sea level to about 1,550 m (5,090 ft).

== Ecology ==
The fruit are eaten by fruit doves (genus Ptilinopus), topknot pigeons (Lopholaimus antarcticus), spotted catbirds (Ailuroedus maculosus), and golden bowerbirds (Prionodura newtoniana).

== Conservation ==
As of August 2024, this species has been assessed to be of least concern by the International Union for Conservation of Nature (IUCN), and also under the Queensland Government's Nature Conservation Act.

== Gallery ==
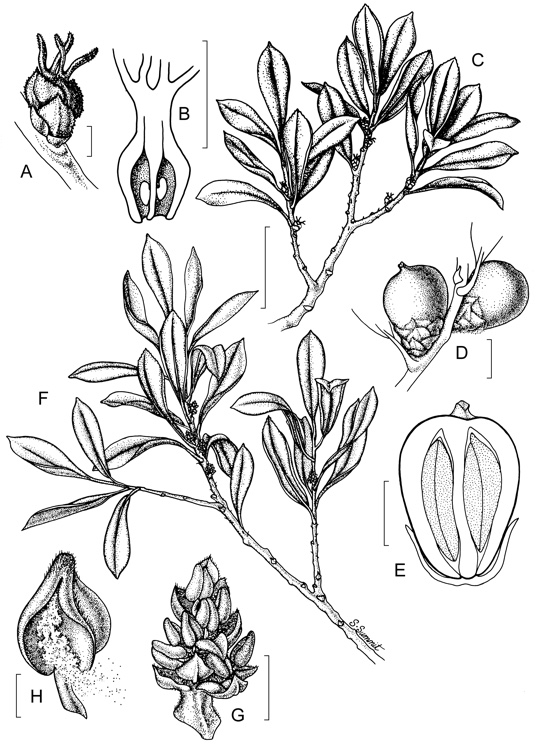
Botanical sketch

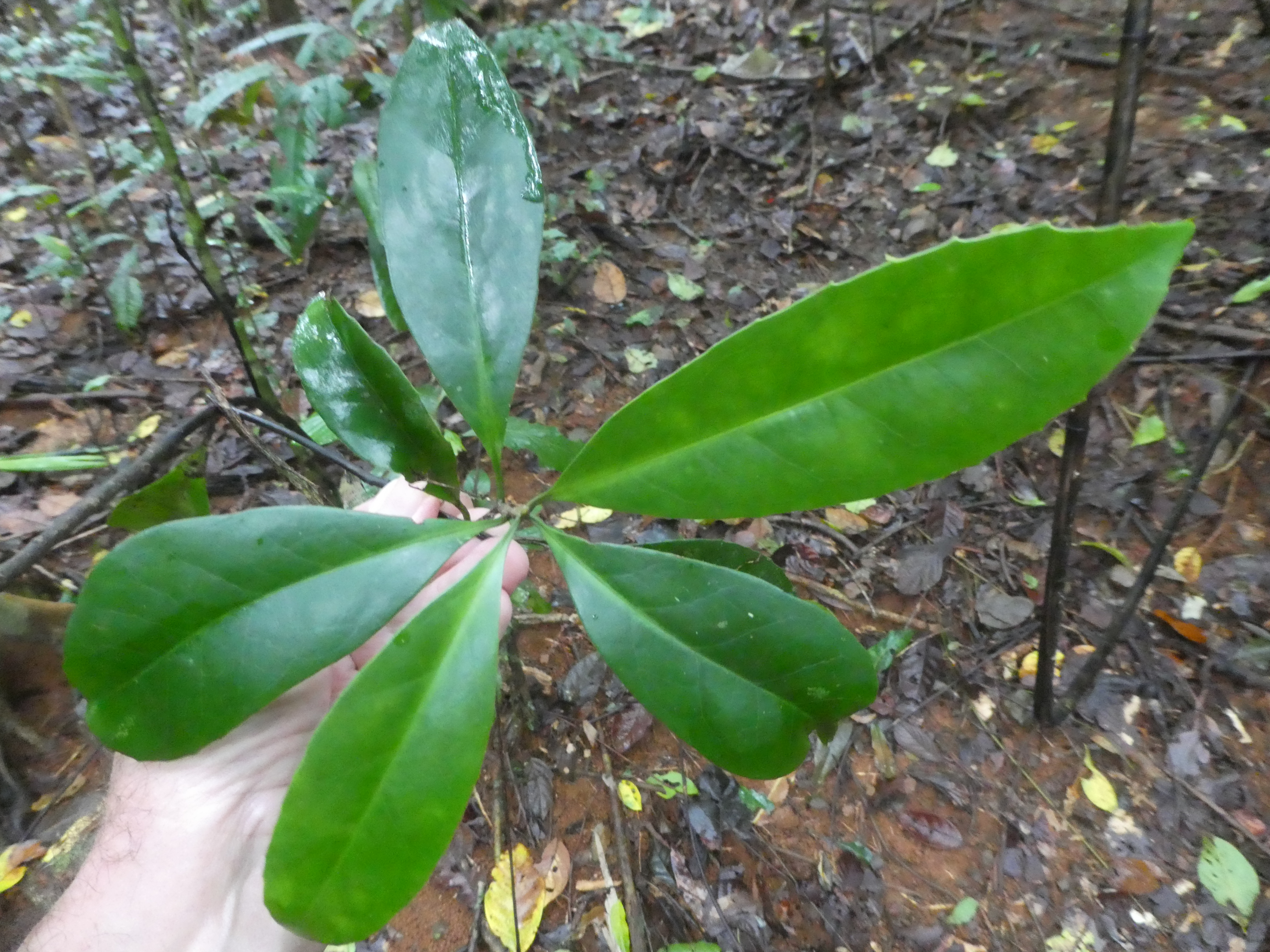
Foliage

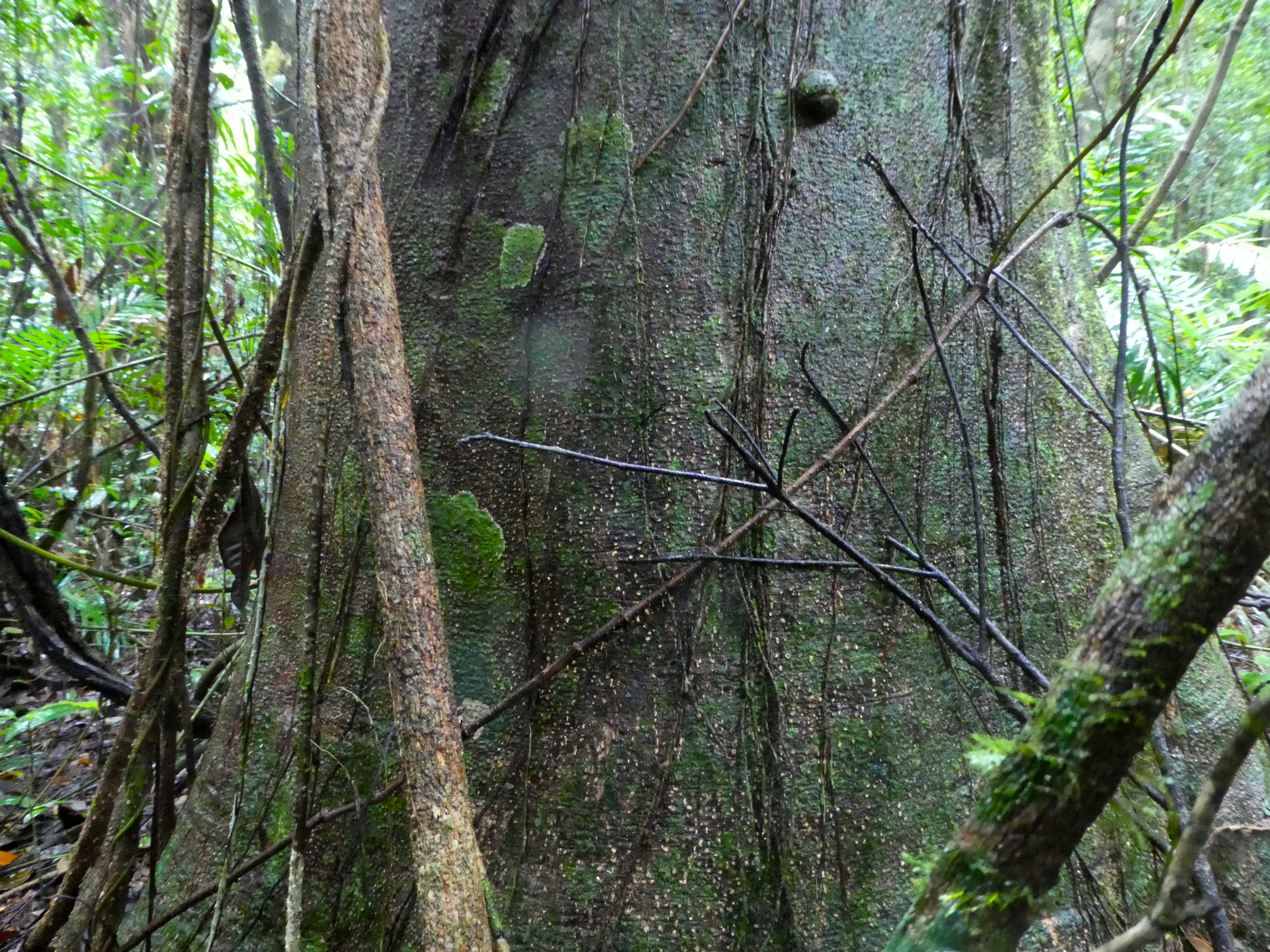
Lower trunk with conspicuous lenticels

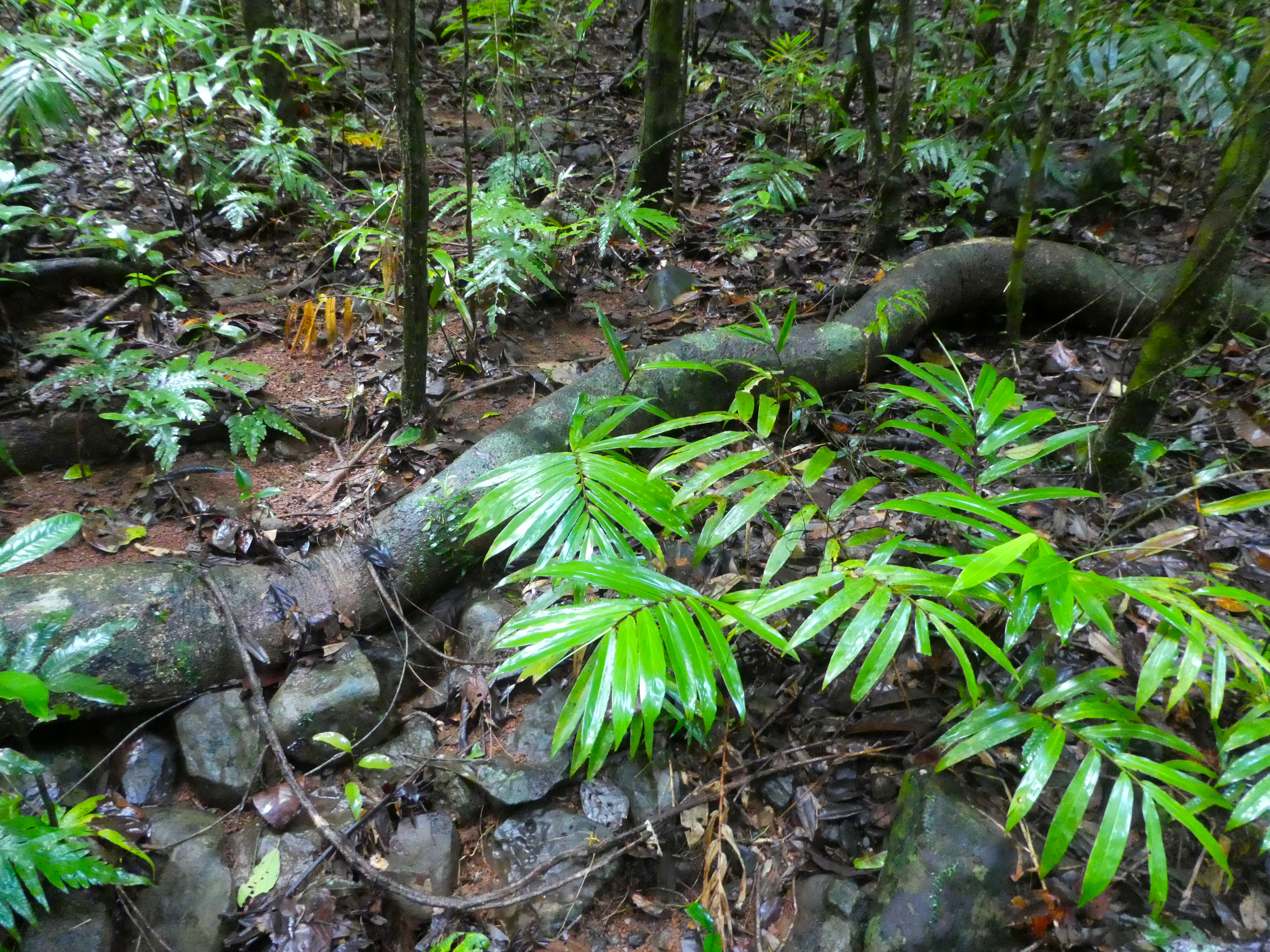
Root travelling across the ground

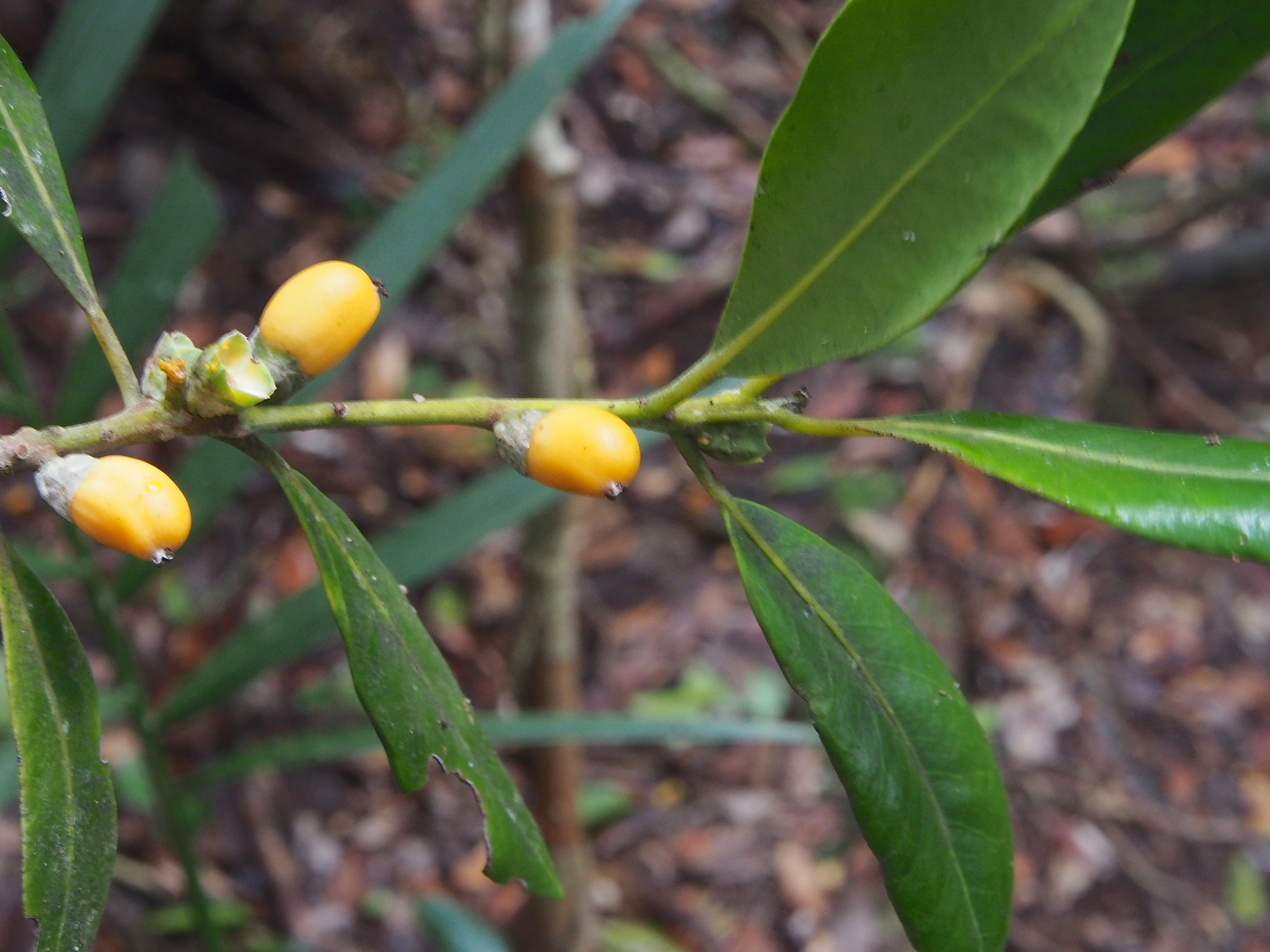
Fruit
