= Dalcera canescens =

Scientific classification
- Kingdom: Animalia
- Phylum: Arthropoda
- Clade: Pancrustacea
- Class: Insecta
- Order: Lepidoptera
- Family: Dalceridae
- Genus: Dalcera
- Species: D. canescens

Binomial name
- Dalcera canescens Tams, 1926

Synonyms
- Dalcera consanguinea Dyar, 1927

Species of moth

Dalcera canescens is a moth in the family Dalceridae. It is found in Suriname, French Guiana, Brazil and Peru.

Adults are on wing in April, July, September and from November to January.
