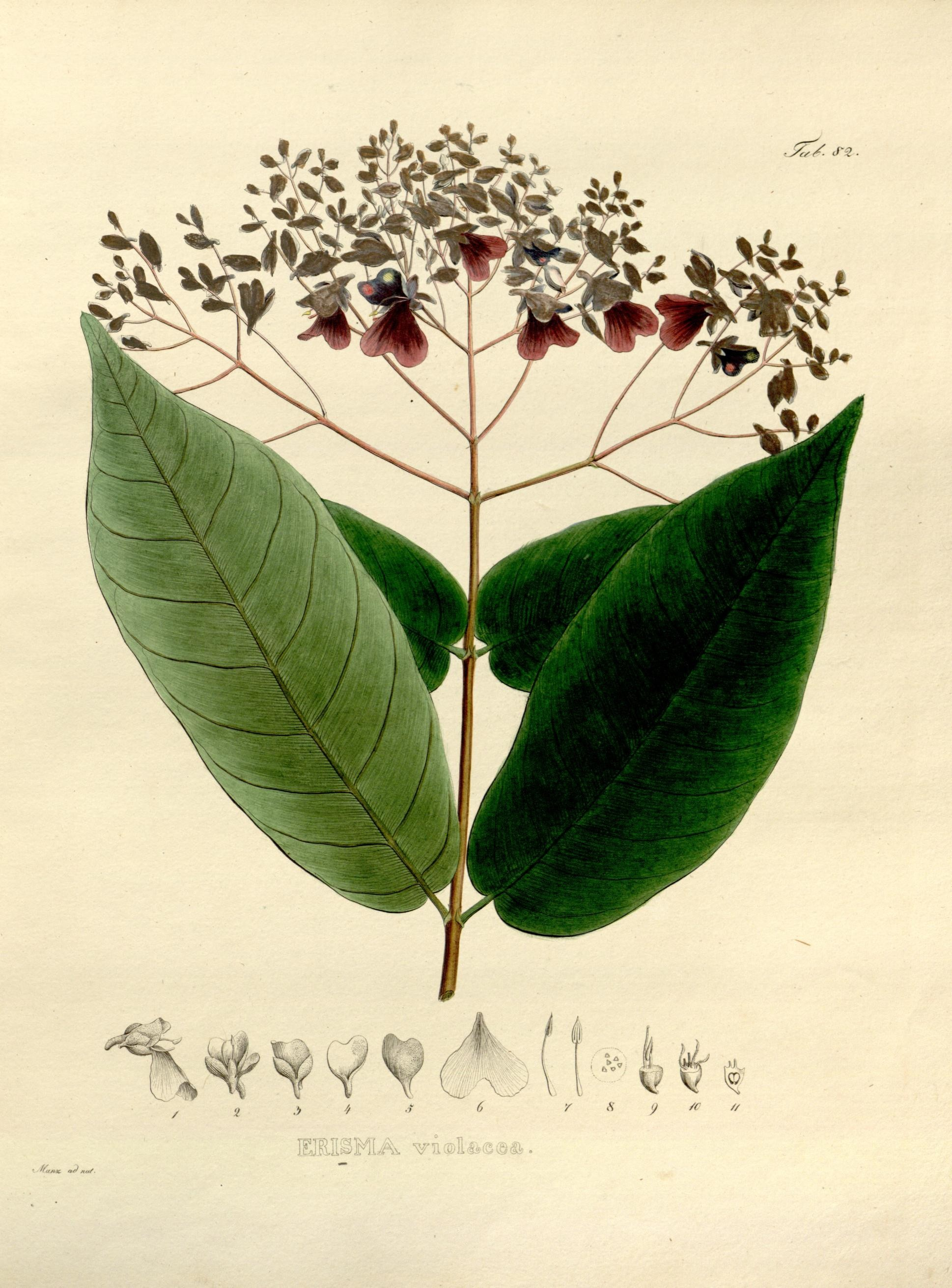

Scientific classification
- Kingdom: Plantae
- Clade: Tracheophytes
- Clade: Angiosperms
- Clade: Eudicots
- Clade: Rosids
- Order: Myrtales
- Family: Vochysiaceae
- Genus: Erisma; Rudge

= Erisma =

Genus of plants

Erisma is a genus of flowering plants belonging to the family Vochysiaceae.

Its native range is Panama to Southern Tropical America.

Species:

- Erisma arietinum M.L.Kawas.
- Erisma bicolor Ducke
- Erisma blancoa Marc.-Berti
- Erisma bracteosum Ducke
- Erisma calcaratum (Link) Warm.
- Erisma costatum Stafleu
- Erisma djalma-batistae Paula
- Erisma floribundum Rudge
- Erisma fuscum Ducke
- Erisma gracile Ducke
- Erisma japura Spruce ex Warm.
- Erisma lanceolatum Stafleu
- Erisma laurifolium Warm.
- Erisma megalophyllum Stafleu
- Erisma micranthum Spruce ex Warm.
- Erisma nitidum DC.
- Erisma panamense M.L.Kawas., S.Castillo & McPherson
- Erisma silvae Marc.-Berti
- Erisma splendens Stafleu
- Erisma tessmannii Pilg.
- Erisma uncinatum Warm.
