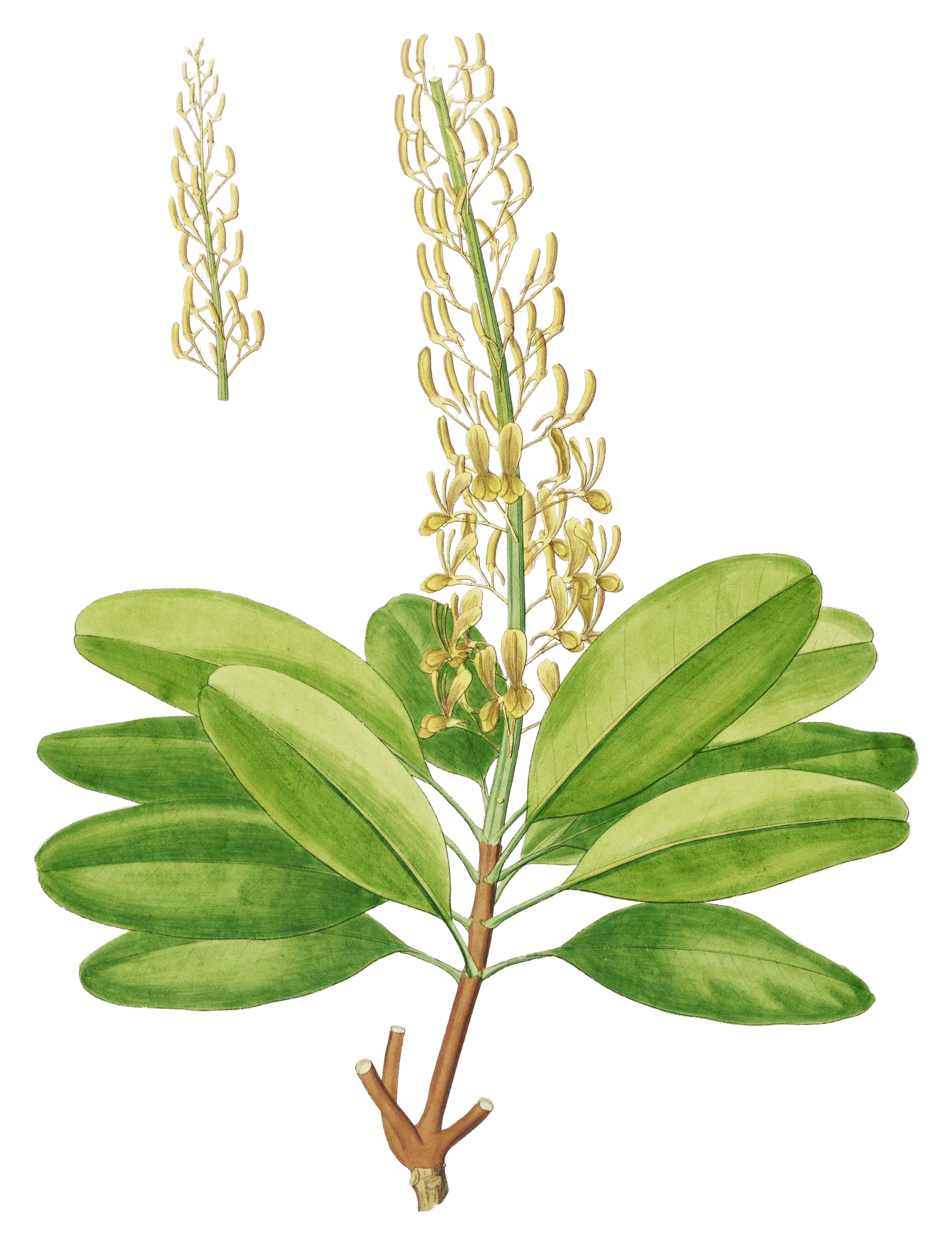
- Vochysia divergens

Scientific classification
- Kingdom: Plantae
- Clade: Tracheophytes
- Clade: Angiosperms
- Clade: Eudicots
- Clade: Rosids
- Order: Myrtales
- Family: Vochysiaceae
- Genus: Vochysia; Aubl.

Species
- 148; see text

Synonyms
- Cucullaria Schreb.; Salmonia Scop.; Strukeria Vell.; Vochya Vell. ex Vand.

= Vochysia =

Genus of flowering plants

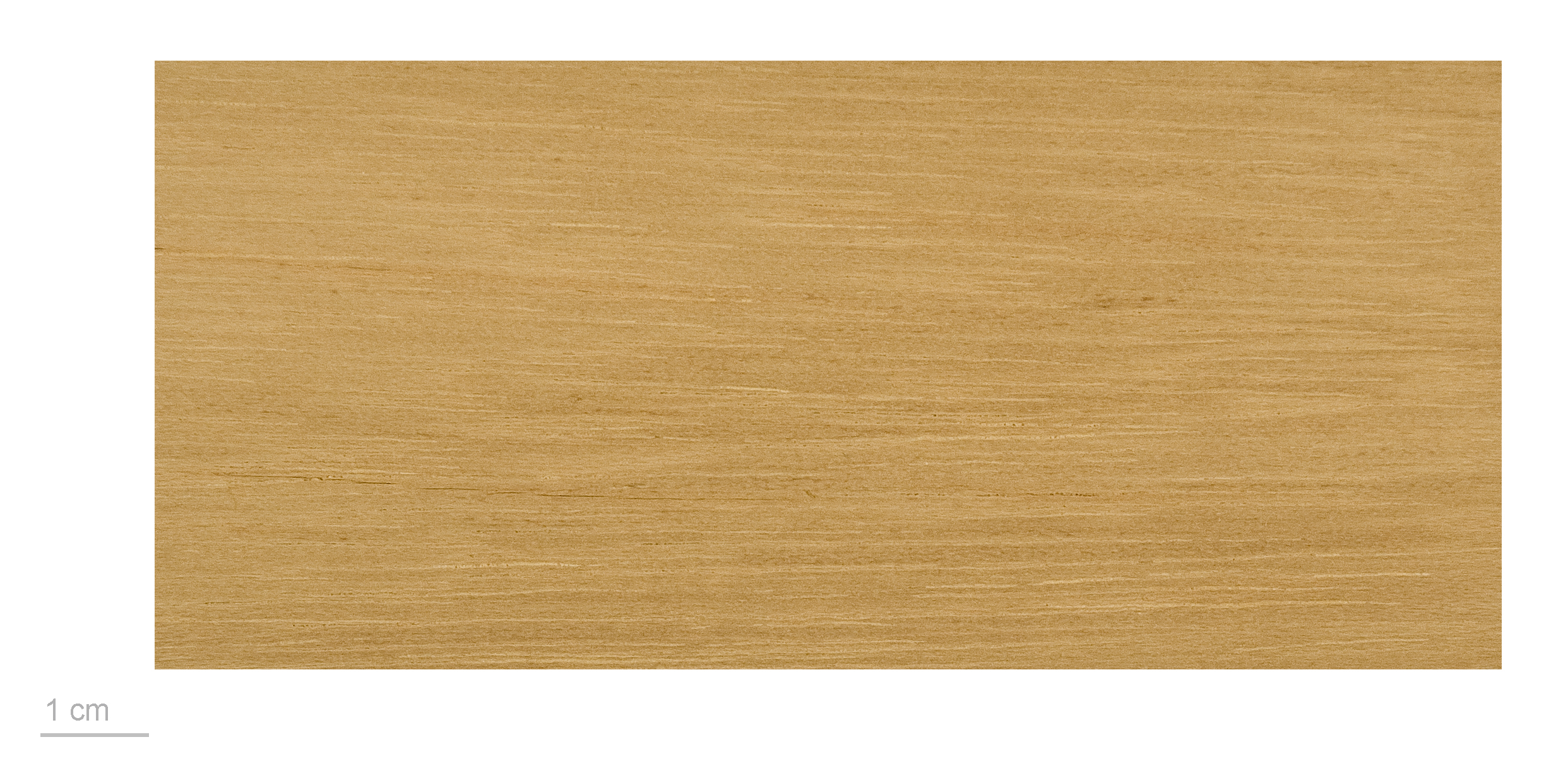
Vochysia tomentosa - MHNT

Vochysia is a genus of plant in the family, Vochysiaceae. It includes 148 species native to the tropical Americas, ranging from southern and eastern Mexico to Bolivia, Paraguay, and southern Brazil.

== Species ==
148 species are accepted.

- Vochysia acuminata Bong.
- Vochysia allenii Standl. & L.O.Williams
- Vochysia angelica M.C.Vianna & Fontella
- Vochysia angustifolia Ducke
- Vochysia antioquia Sanoja & Marc.-Berti
- Vochysia apopetala Ule
- Vochysia artantha Stafleu
- Vochysia assua Stafleu
- Vochysia aurantiaca Stafleu
- Vochysia aurifera Standl. & L.O.Williams
- Vochysia awasensis Huamantupa
- Vochysia bautistae Marc.-Berti
- Vochysia bifalcata Warm.
- Vochysia biloba Ducke
- Vochysia boliviana Rusby
- Vochysia braceliniae Standl.
- Vochysia caesia Stafleu
- Vochysia calamana Stafleu
- Vochysia calophylla Spruce ex Warm.
- Vochysia caroliae-scottii Marc.-Berti & Aymard
- Vochysia cassiquiarensis Stafleu
- Vochysia catingae Ducke
- Vochysia cayennensis Warm.
- Vochysia cinnamomea Pohl
- Vochysia citrifolia Poir.
- Vochysia columbiensis Marc.-Berti
- Vochysia complicata Ducke
- Vochysia condorensis Huamantupa & D.A.Neill
- Vochysia costata Warm.
- Vochysia crassifolia Warm.
- Vochysia dardanoi M.C.Vianna & Fontella
- Vochysia dasyantha Warm.
- Vochysia densiflora Spruce ex Warm.
- Vochysia discolor Warm.
- Vochysia divergens Pohl
- Vochysia diversa J.F.Macbr.
- Vochysia duquei Pilg.
- Vochysia elegans Stafleu
- Vochysia elliptica Mart.
- Vochysia emarginata (Vahl) Vahl ex Poir.
- Vochysia eximia Ducke
- Vochysia expansa Ducke
- Vochysia ferruginea Mart.
- Vochysia floribunda Mart.
- Vochysia fontellae Paula
- Vochysia garcia-barrigae Marc.-Berti
- Vochysia gardneri Warm.
- Vochysia gentryi Marc.-Berti
- Vochysia gigantea Stafleu
- Vochysia glaberrima Warm.
- Vochysia glazioviana Warm.
- Vochysia grandis Mart.
- Vochysia guatemalensis Donn.Sm.
- Vochysia guianensis Aubl.
- Vochysia gummifera Mart. ex Warm.
- Vochysia haenkeana Mart.
- Vochysia hannekesaskiae Marc.-Berti
- Vochysia herbacea Pohl
- Vochysia ingens Ducke
- Vochysia inundata Ducke
- Vochysia jefensis A.Robyns
- Vochysia jonkeri Marc.-Berti
- Vochysia julianensis Marc.-Berti
- Vochysia kosnipatae Huamantupa
- Vochysia lanceolata Stafleu
- Vochysia laurifolia Warm.
- Vochysia laxiflora Stafleu
- Vochysia ledouxii Paula
- Vochysia leguiana J.F.Macbr.
- Vochysia lehmannii Hieron.
- Vochysia liscanoi Marc.-Berti
- Vochysia lomatophylla Standl.
- Vochysia lopezpalacioi Marc.-Berti
- Vochysia lucida C.Presl
- Vochysia magna Stafleu
- Vochysia magnifica Warm.
- Vochysia maguirei Marc.-Berti
- Vochysia majuscula Pilg.
- Vochysia mapirensis Rusby
- Vochysia mapuerae Huber ex Ducke
- Vochysia mariziana Paula & J.L.Alves
- Vochysia martiana Stafleu
- Vochysia maxima Ducke
- Vochysia megalantha Stafleu
- Vochysia megalophylla Stafleu
- Vochysia meridensis Marc.-Berti
- Vochysia microphylla G.H.Shimizu & K.Yamam.
- Vochysia moskovitsiana Huamantupa
- Vochysia neyratii Normand
- Vochysia obidensis (Huber) Ducke
- Vochysia oblongifolia Warm.
- Vochysia obovata Stafleu
- Vochysia obscura Warm.
- Vochysia oppugnata (Vell.) Warm.
- Vochysia ortegae Marc.-Berti & J.Bautista
- Vochysia pachyantha Ducke
- Vochysia pacifica Cuatrec.
- Vochysia palmirana F.França & Proença
- Vochysia parviflora Spruce ex Warm.
- Vochysia pauciflora Steyerm.
- Vochysia penae Marc.-Berti
- Vochysia peruviana Huamantupa
- Vochysia petraea Warm.
- Vochysia pinkusii A.C.Sm.
- Vochysia poncy-barrieri Marc.-Berti
- Vochysia pongo-qonecensis Huamantupa
- Vochysia pruinosa Pohl
- Vochysia pumila Pohl
- Vochysia punctata Spruce ex Warm.
- Vochysia pygmaea Bong.
- Vochysia pyramidalis Mart.
- Vochysia rectiflora Warm.
- Vochysia revoluta Ducke
- Vochysia riedeliana Stafleu
- Vochysia rotundifolia Mart.
- Vochysia rubiginosa Stafleu
- Vochysia rufa Mart.
- Vochysia rufescens W.A.Rodrigues
- Vochysia sabatieri Marc.-Berti
- Vochysia saccata Stafleu
- Vochysia saldanhana Warm.
- Vochysia santaluciae M.C.Vianna & Fontella
- Vochysia schomburgkii Warm.
- Vochysia schwackeana Warm.
- Vochysia selloi Warm.
- Vochysia sessilifolia Warm.
- Vochysia sobralii G.H.Shimizu & D.J.P.Gonç.
- Vochysia sofiae Marc.-Berti & Poncy
- Vochysia spathiphylla Stafleu
- Vochysia spathulata Warm.
- Vochysia speciosa Warm.
- Vochysia splendens Spruce ex Warm.
- Vochysia sprucei Warm.
- Vochysia stafleui Marc.-Berti
- Vochysia steyermarkiana Marc.-Berti
- Vochysia surinamensis Stafleu
- Vochysia tabascana Sprague
- Vochysia talmonii M.C.Vianna, Fontella & F.França
- Vochysia tepuiandina Huamantupa
- Vochysia tetraphylla (G.Mey.) DC.
- Vochysia thyrsoidea Pohl
- Vochysia tillettii Marc.-Berti
- Vochysia tomentosa (G.Mey.) DC.
- Vochysia tucanorum Mart.
- Vochysia venezuelana Stafleu
- Vochysia venulosa Warm.
- Vochysia vismiifolia Spruce ex Warm.
- Vochysia wilsonii Marc.-Berti, J.M.Vélez. & Aymard
