= Ruizterania =

Scientific classification
- Kingdom: Plantae
- Clade: Tracheophytes
- Clade: Angiosperms
- Clade: Eudicots
- Clade: Rosids
- Order: Myrtales
- Family: Vochysiaceae
- Genus: Ruizterania; Marc.-Berti

Genus of flowering plant

Ruizterania is a genus of flowering plants belonging to the family Vochysiaceae.

Its native range is southern Tropical America. It is found in Bolivia, Brazil, Colombia, Ecuador, French Guiana, Guyana, Peru, Suriname and Venezuela.

The genus name of Ruizterania is in honour of Luis Enrique Ruíz-Terán (1923–1979), a Venezuelan researcher and university professor of botany. It was first described and published in Pittieria Vol.2 on page 6 in 1969.

== Known species ==
According to Kew:

- Ruizterania albiflora (Warm.) Marc.-Berti
- Ruizterania belemnensis (Stafleu) Marc.-Berti
- Ruizterania cassiquiarensis (Spruce ex Warm.) Marc.-Berti
- Ruizterania esmeraldae (Standl.) Marc.-Berti
- Ruizterania ferruginea (Steyerm.) Marc.-Berti
- Ruizterania gardneriana (Warm.) Marc.-Berti
- Ruizterania nitida (Stafleu) Marc.-Berti
- Ruizterania obtusata (Briq.) Marc.-Berti
- Ruizterania retusa (Spruce ex Warm.) Marc.-Berti
- Ruizterania rigida (Stafleu) Marc.-Berti
- Ruizterania sacculata (Stafleu) Marc.-Berti
- Ruizterania trichanthera (Spruce ex Warm.) Marc.-Berti
- Ruizterania urceolata (Stafleu) Marc.-Berti
- Ruizterania wittrockii (Malme) Marc.-Berti
