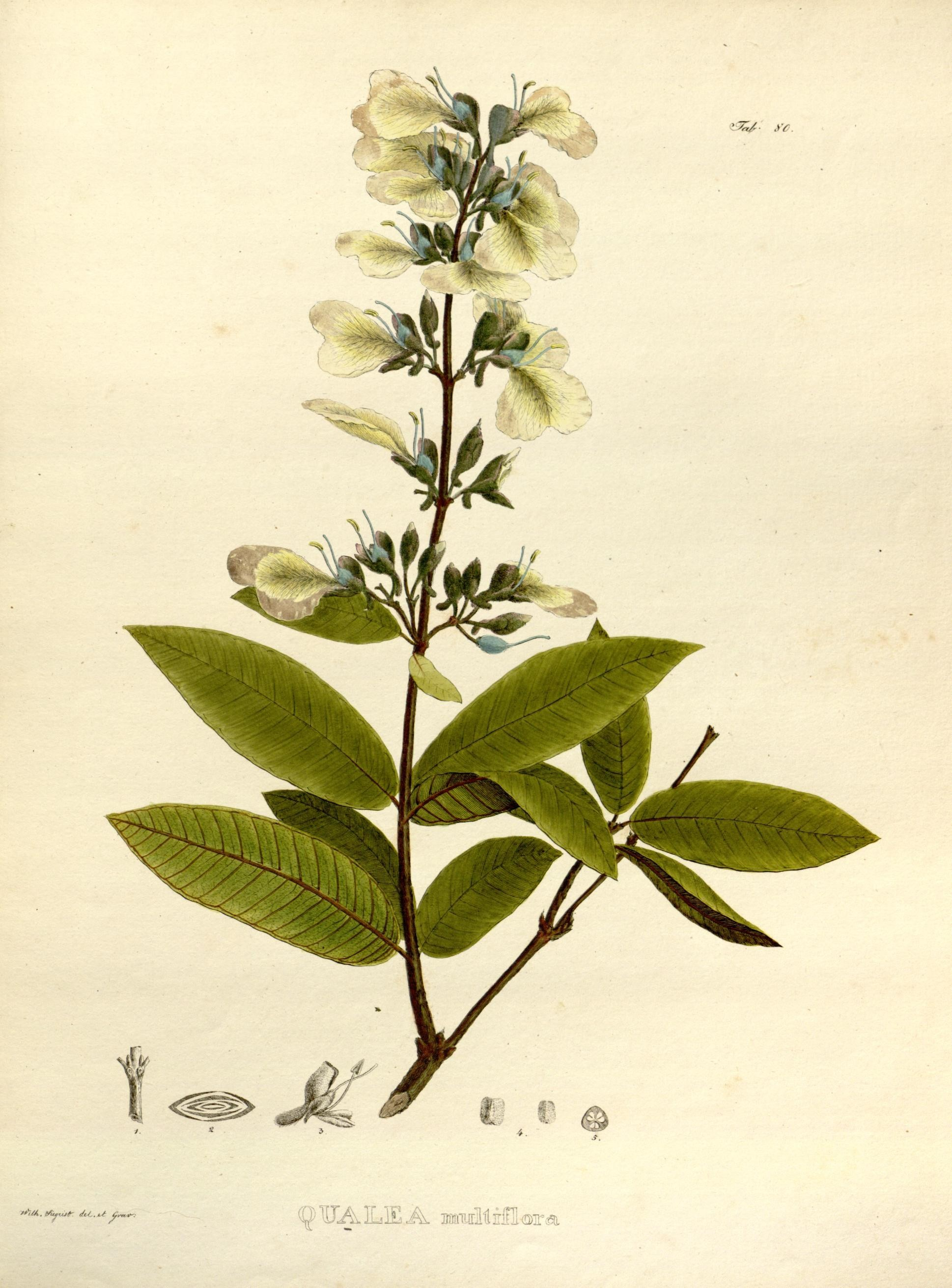

Scientific classification
- Kingdom: Plantae
- Clade: Tracheophytes
- Clade: Angiosperms
- Clade: Eudicots
- Clade: Rosids
- Order: Myrtales
- Family: Vochysiaceae
- Genus: Qualea
- Species: Q. multiflora

Binomial name
- Qualea multiflora Mart.

Synonyms
- Qualea macroptera Link ex A.Dietr.; Qualea multiflora var. glabra Mart.; Qualea subvillosa Link ex A.Dietr.; Qualea subvillosa var. glabrifolia Warm.

= Qualea multiflora =

Species of tree

Qualea multiflora is a species of tree in the family Vochysiaceae.

Trees in this species can grow up to 6 m tall. The species has hairy leaves and extrafloral nectaries which possibly help reduce herbivory. Q. multiflora gets pollinated by bees in he uses like Xylocopa and Centris.

The species is native to neotropics in countries like Bolivia, Brazil, Paraguay, and Peru. The species naturally grows in acid soils.
