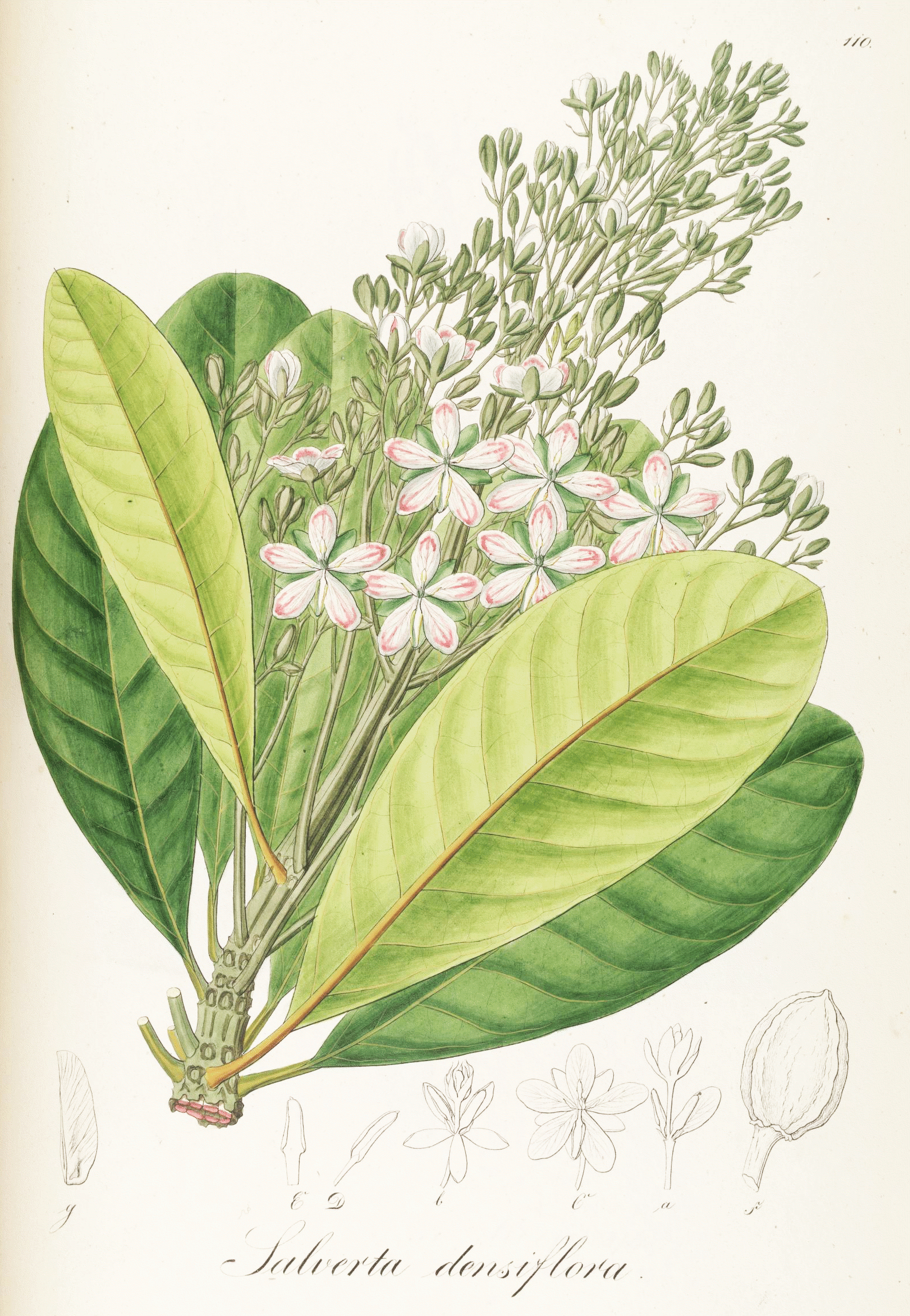
- Salverta densiflora

Scientific classification
- Kingdom: Plantae
- Clade: Tracheophytes
- Clade: Angiosperms
- Clade: Eudicots
- Clade: Rosids
- Order: Myrtales
- Family: Vochysiaceae
- Genus: Salvertia; A.St.-Hil.
- Species: S. convallariodora

Binomial name
- Salvertia convallariodora A.St.-Hil.

Synonyms
- Salvertia thyrsiflora Pohl

= Salvertia =

Species of flowering plant

Salvertia is a monotypic genus of flowering plants belonging to the family Vochysiaceae. The only species is Salvertia convallariodora.

It is native to Suriname, Brazil and Bolivia.

The genus name of Salvertia is in honour of Augustin Amable Dutour de Salvert or Du Tour de Salvert Bellenave (1781–1838), a French botanist and writer, brother-in-law of the author of the genus, Augustin Saint-Hilaire. The Latin specific epithet of convallariodora refers to smelling (-odora) like flowers of the plant genus Convallaria. Both the genus and the species were first described and published in Mém. Mus. Hist. Nat. Vol.6 on page 266 in 1820.
