= Dalcera semirufa =

Scientific classification
- Domain: Eukaryota
- Kingdom: Animalia
- Phylum: Arthropoda
- Class: Insecta
- Order: Lepidoptera
- Family: Dalceridae
- Genus: Dalcera
- Species: D. semirufa

Binomial name
- Dalcera semirufa H. Druce, 1910

Species of moth

Dalcera semirufa is a moth in the family Dalceridae first described by Herbert Druce in 1910. It is found on the western slopes of the Andes Mountains in Colombia. The habitat consists of tropical wet and tropical rain forests.

Adults are on wing in May, June and August.
