= Dalcera haywardi =

Scientific classification
- Kingdom: Animalia
- Phylum: Arthropoda
- Clade: Pancrustacea
- Class: Insecta
- Order: Lepidoptera
- Family: Dalceridae
- Genus: Dalcera
- Species: D. haywardi

Binomial name
- Dalcera haywardi Orfila, 1961

Species of moth

Dalcera haywardi is a moth in the family Dalceridae. It is found in northern Argentina. The habitat probably consists of warm temperate moist forests.

The wingspan is 34–38 mm. Adults have been recorded on wing in October.
