= Balanops balansae =

Conservation status
- Conservation Dependent (IUCN 2.3)

Scientific classification
- Kingdom: Plantae
- Clade: Tracheophytes
- Clade: Angiosperms
- Clade: Eudicots
- Clade: Rosids
- Order: Malpighiales
- Family: Balanopaceae
- Genus: Balanops
- Species: B. balansae

Binomial name
- Balanops balansae Baill.

Species of flowering plant

Balanops balansae is a species of plant in the Balanopaceae family. It is endemic to New Caledonia.
