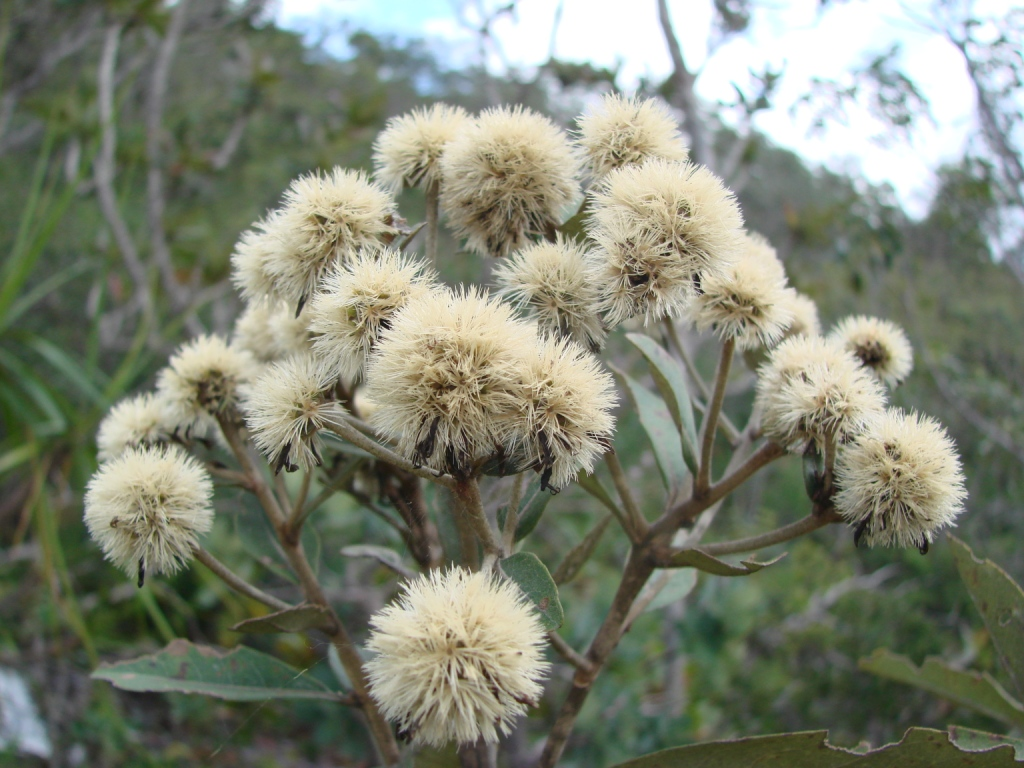
- Eremanthus glomeratus

Scientific classification
- Kingdom: Plantae
- Clade: Tracheophytes
- Clade: Angiosperms
- Clade: Eudicots
- Clade: Asterids
- Order: Asterales
- Family: Asteraceae
- Subfamily: Vernonioideae
- Tribe: Vernonieae
- Genus: Eremanthus; Less.

Synonyms
- Laxopetalum Pohl ex Baker; Vanillosmopsis Sch.Bip.

= Eremanthus =

Genus of flowering plants

Eremanthus is a genus of plants belonging to the family Asteraceae. Species occur in Brazil and Bolivia.

Eremanthus species are eaten by the larvae of some Lepidoptera species including Dalcera abrasa which has been recorded on E. glomerulatus.

== Species ==
Species accepted by the Plants of the World Online as of March 2023:

- Eremanthus arboreus (Gardner) MacLeish
- Eremanthus argenteus MacLeish & H.Schumach.
- Eremanthus auriculatus MacLeish & H.Schumach.
- Eremanthus brasiliensis (Gardner) MacLeish
- Eremanthus brevifolius Loeuille
- Eremanthus capitatus (Spreng.) MacLeish
- Eremanthus cinctus Baker
- Eremanthus crotonoides (DC.) Sch.Bip.
- Eremanthus elaeagnus (Mart. ex DC.) Sch.Bip.
- Eremanthus erythropappus (DC.) MacLeish
- Eremanthus glomerulatus Less.
- Eremanthus goyazensis (Gardner) Sch.Bip.
- Eremanthus hatschbachii H.Rob.
- Eremanthus incanus Less.
- Eremanthus mattogrossensis Kuntze
- Eremanthus mollis Sch.Bip.
- Eremanthus ovatifolius Loeuille & Pirani
- Eremanthus polycephalus (DC.) MacLeish
- Eremanthus praetermissus Loeuille & Pirani
- Eremanthus reticulatus (Gardner) Loeuille, Semir & Pirani
- Eremanthus rondoniensis MacLeish & H.Schumach.
- Eremanthus syncephalus (Sch.Bip.) Loeuille, Semir & Pirani
- Eremanthus uniflorus MacLeish & H.Schumach.
- Eremanthus veadeiroensis H.Rob.
