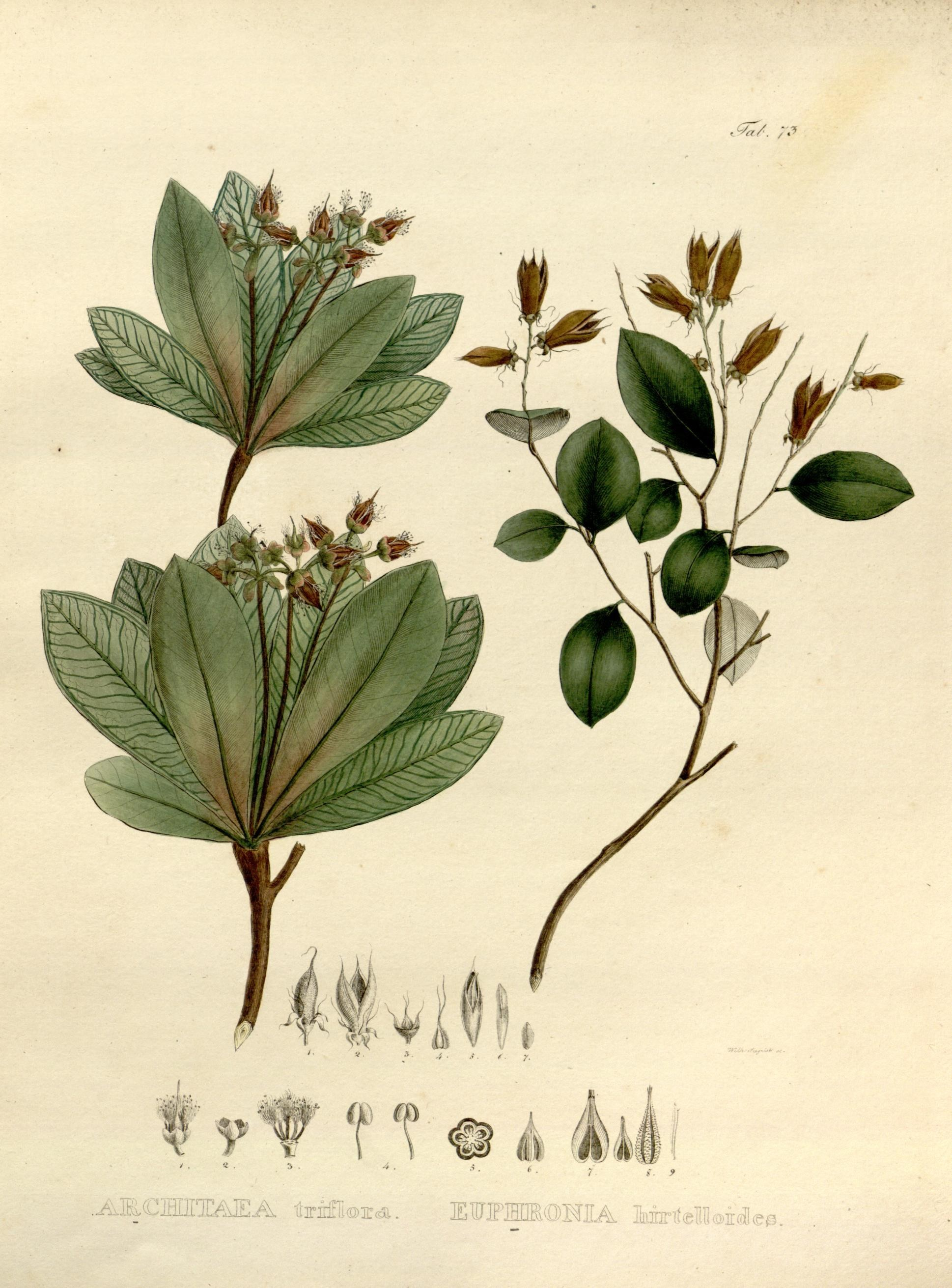
- Euphronia hirtelloides on left

Scientific classification
- Kingdom: Plantae
- Clade: Tracheophytes
- Clade: Angiosperms
- Clade: Eudicots
- Clade: Rosids
- Order: Malpighiales
- Family: Euphroniaceae; Marc.-Berti
- Genus: Euphronia; Mart. & Zucc.

Species
- Euphronia guianensis; Euphronia hirtelloides; Euphronia acuminatissima

= Euphronia =

Genus of flowering plants

Euphronia is a genus of three species of shrubs native to northern South America and is the only genus in the family Euphroniaceae. It was previously classified in the Vochysiaceae family and elsewhere due to its unique floral features, but the APG III system of 2009 recognized Euphroniaceae as distinct and placed Euphronia in it. Based on molecular data from the rbcL gene, it is sister to the Chrysobalanaceae.

== Classification ==
The genus was originally described by Carl Friedrich Philipp von Martius and Joseph Gerhard Zuccarini in 1824 when they described Euphronia hirtelloides as a new species. In 1918, the German botanist Johannes Gottfried Hallier reclassified what was then known as Lightia guianensis as a species in this genus: Euphronia guianensis. And in 1987, the American botanist Julian Alfred Steyermark described the third species, Euphronia acuminatissima. It was proposed in 1989 that the family Euphroniaceae be erected to contain the genus because it was sufficiently different from other related genera. An analysis of the molecular phylogenetics of these related genera and families in 1998 supported the decision to retain the genus within a monotypic family.
