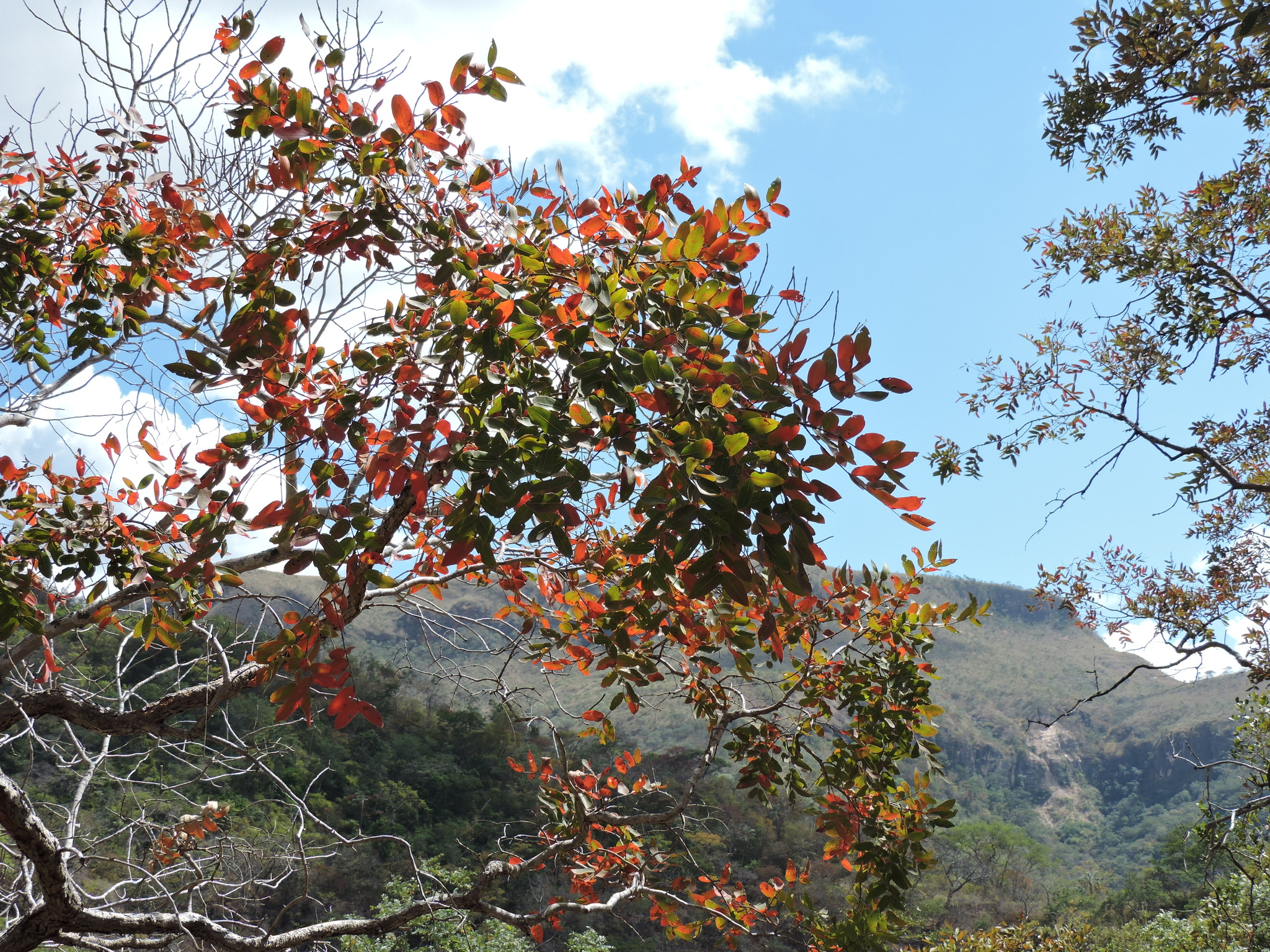
- Callisthene minor

Scientific classification
- Kingdom: Plantae
- Clade: Embryophytes
- Clade: Tracheophytes
- Clade: Spermatophytes
- Clade: Angiosperms
- Clade: Eudicots
- Clade: Rosids
- Order: Myrtales
- Family: Vochysiaceae
- Genus: Callisthene; Mart.

= Callisthene =

Genus of flowering plants

Callisthene is a genus of flowering plants belonging to the family Vochysiaceae.

Its native range is Brazil, Bolivia, Paraguay.

Species:

- Callisthene dryadum Duarte
- Callisthene erythroclada Warm.
- Callisthene fasciculata Mart.
- Callisthene inundata O.L.Bueno, A.D.Nilson & R.G.Magalh.
- Callisthene major Mart.
- Callisthene microphylla Warm.
- Callisthene minor Mart.
- Callisthene mollissima Warm.
