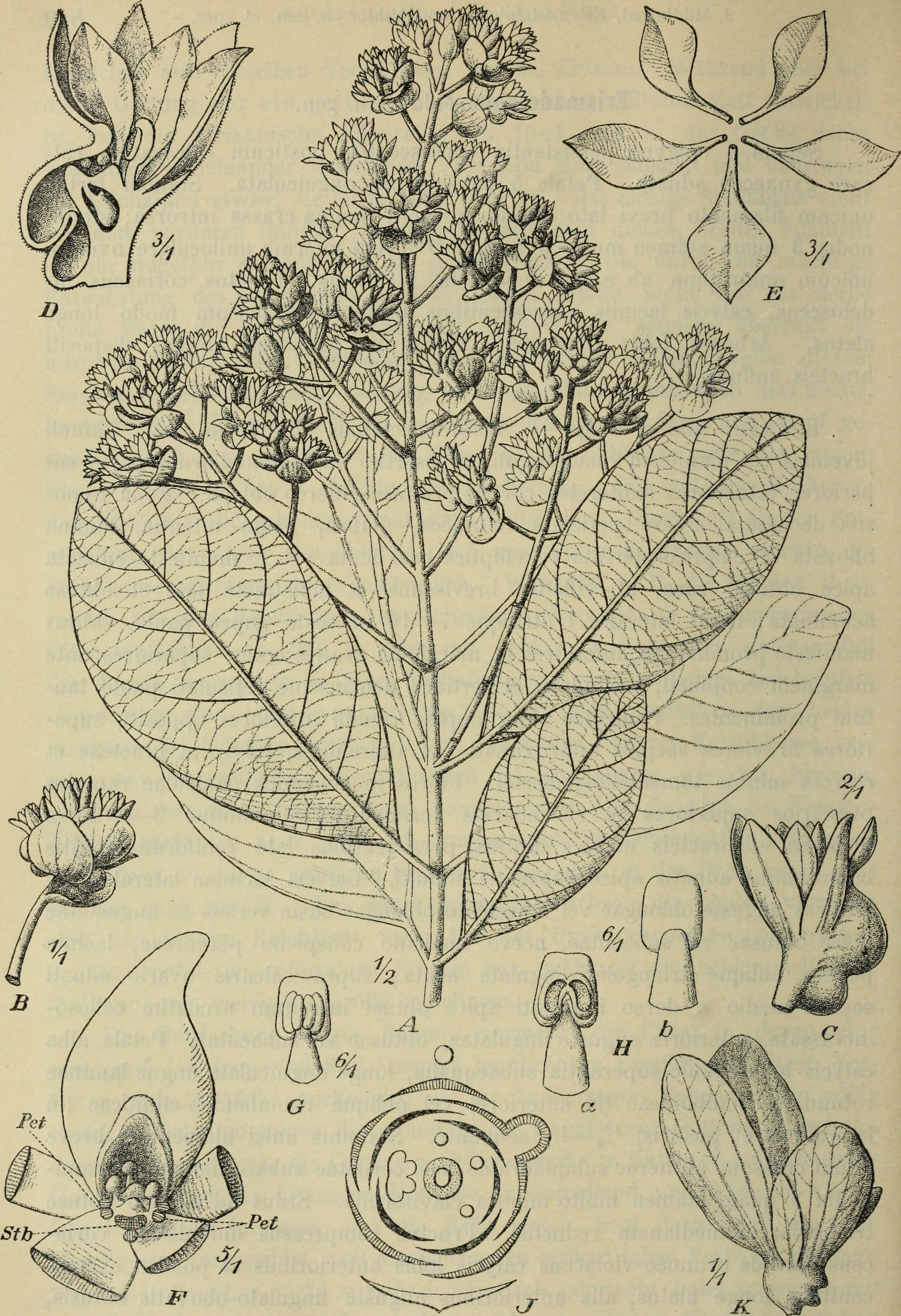
- Botanische Jahrbücher für Systematik, Pflanzengeschichte und Pflanzengeographie (1912)

Scientific classification
- Kingdom: Plantae
- Clade: Tracheophytes
- Clade: Angiosperms
- Clade: Eudicots
- Clade: Rosids
- Order: Myrtales
- Family: Vochysiaceae
- Genus: Erismadelphus; Mildbr.

= Erismadelphus =

Genus of plants

Erismadelphus is a genus of flowering plants belonging to the family Vochysiaceae.

Its native range is Southern Nigeria to Western Central Tropical Africa.

== Species ==
Species:

- Erismadelphus exsul Mildbr.
- Erismadelphus sessilis Keay & Stafleu
