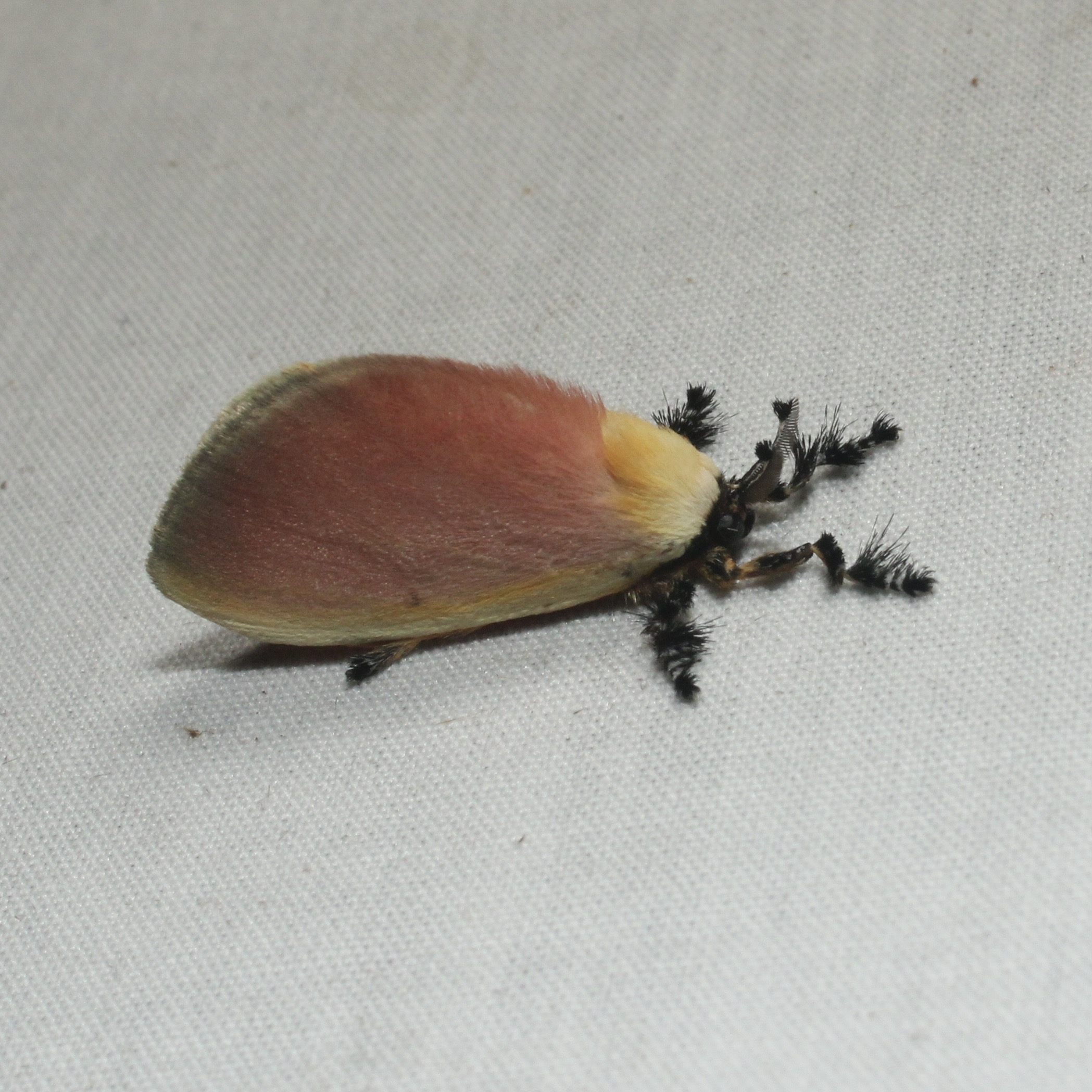

Scientific classification
- Kingdom: Animalia
- Phylum: Arthropoda
- Clade: Pancrustacea
- Class: Insecta
- Order: Lepidoptera
- Family: Dalceridae
- Genus: Dalcera
- Species: D. abrasa

Binomial name
- Dalcera abrasa Herrich-Schaffer, 1854

= Dalcera abrasa =

Species of moth

Dalcera abrasa is a moth in the family Dalceridae. It is found in Colombia, Venezuela, Guyana, Suriname, French Guiana, Brazil, Peru, and Bolivia.

The forewing length is 15–20 mm (0.59–0.79 in) for males and 20–26 mm (0.79–1.02 in) for females. The larvae feed on Coffea arabica, Echinochloa polystachia, Eucalyptus robusta, and Spondias purpurea.
