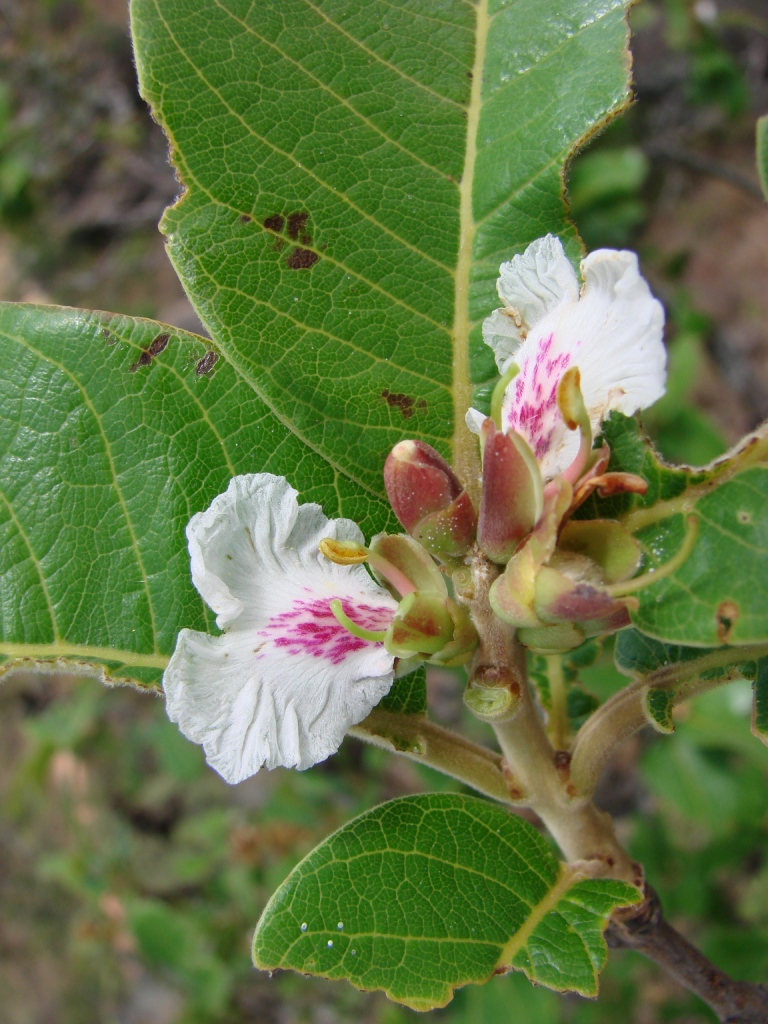
- Qualea dichotoma

Scientific classification
- Kingdom: Plantae
- Clade: Tracheophytes
- Clade: Angiosperms
- Clade: Eudicots
- Clade: Rosids
- Order: Myrtales
- Family: Vochysiaceae
- Genus: Qualea; Aubl.

Species
- 53, see text

Synonyms
- Agardhia Spreng.; Amphilochia Mart.; Schuechia Endl.

= Qualea =

Genus of flowering plants

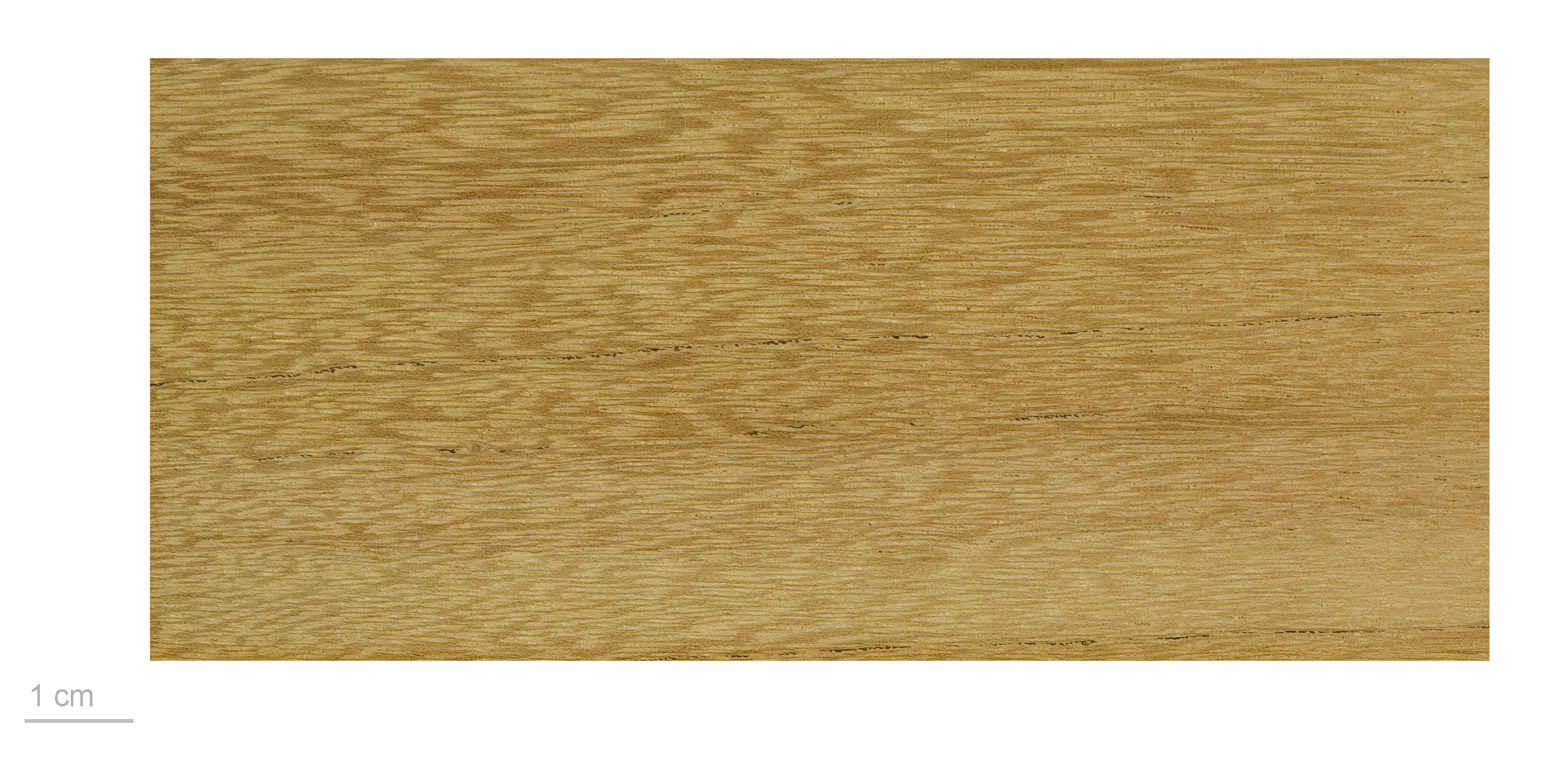
Qualea rosea - MHNT

Qualea is a flowering plant genus in the family Vochysiaceae. These plants occur in the Neotropics and their wood makes good timber and firewood and is used in construction. Some species of Qualea have medicinal properties.

== Species ==
There are 53 species assigned to this genus:

- Qualea acuminata Spruce ex Warm.
- Qualea amapaensis Balslev & S.A.Mori
- Qualea amoena Ducke
- Qualea brasiliana Stafleu & Marc.-Berti
- Qualea brevipedicellata Stafleu
- Qualea caerulea Aubl.
- Qualea calantha Pilg.
- Qualea calophylla Pittier
- Qualea clavata Stafleu
- Qualea cordata Spreng.
  - Qualea cordata var. dichotoma (Mart.) M.Lisboa & K.Yamam. (synonym Qualea dichotoma (Mart.) Warm.)
- Qualea cryptantha (Spreng.) Warm.
- Qualea cyanea Ducke
- Qualea cymulosa Schery
- Qualea decorticans Ducke
- Qualea densiflora Warm.
- Qualea dinizii Ducke
- Qualea elegans Taub.
- Qualea gestasiana A.St.-Hil.
- Qualea glaziovii Warm.
- Qualea gracilior Pilg.
- Qualea grandiflora Mart.
- Qualea hannekesaskiarum Marc.-Berti
- Qualea homosepala Ducke
- Qualea impexa J.F.Macbr.
- Qualea ingens Warm. – "arrayán" (Colombia)
- Qualea insignis G.H.Shimizu, D.J.P.Gonç., F.França & K.Yamam.
- Qualea johannabakkerae Marc.-Berti
- Qualea labouriauana Paula
- Qualea lineata Stafleu
- Qualea lundii (Warm.) Warm.
- Qualea macropetala Spruce ex Warm.
- Qualea magna Kuhlm.
- Qualea marioniae Marc.-Berti
- Qualea megalocarpa Stafleu
- Qualea mori-boomii Marc.-Berti
- Qualea multiflora Mart.
- Qualea panamensis Marc.-Berti
- Qualea paraensis Ducke
- Qualea parviflora Mart.
- Qualea polychroma Stafleu
- Qualea psidiifolia Spruce ex Warm.
- Qualea pulcherrima Spruce ex Warm.
- Qualea rosea Aubl.
- Qualea rupicola Ducke
- Qualea schomburgkiana Warm.
- Qualea selloi Warm.
- Qualea sprucei Warm.
- Qualea suprema Ducke
- Qualea tessmannii Mildbr.
- Qualea themistoclesii Ducke
- Qualea tricolor Benoist
- Qualea tuberculata Stafleu
- Qualea wurdackii Marc.-Berti
