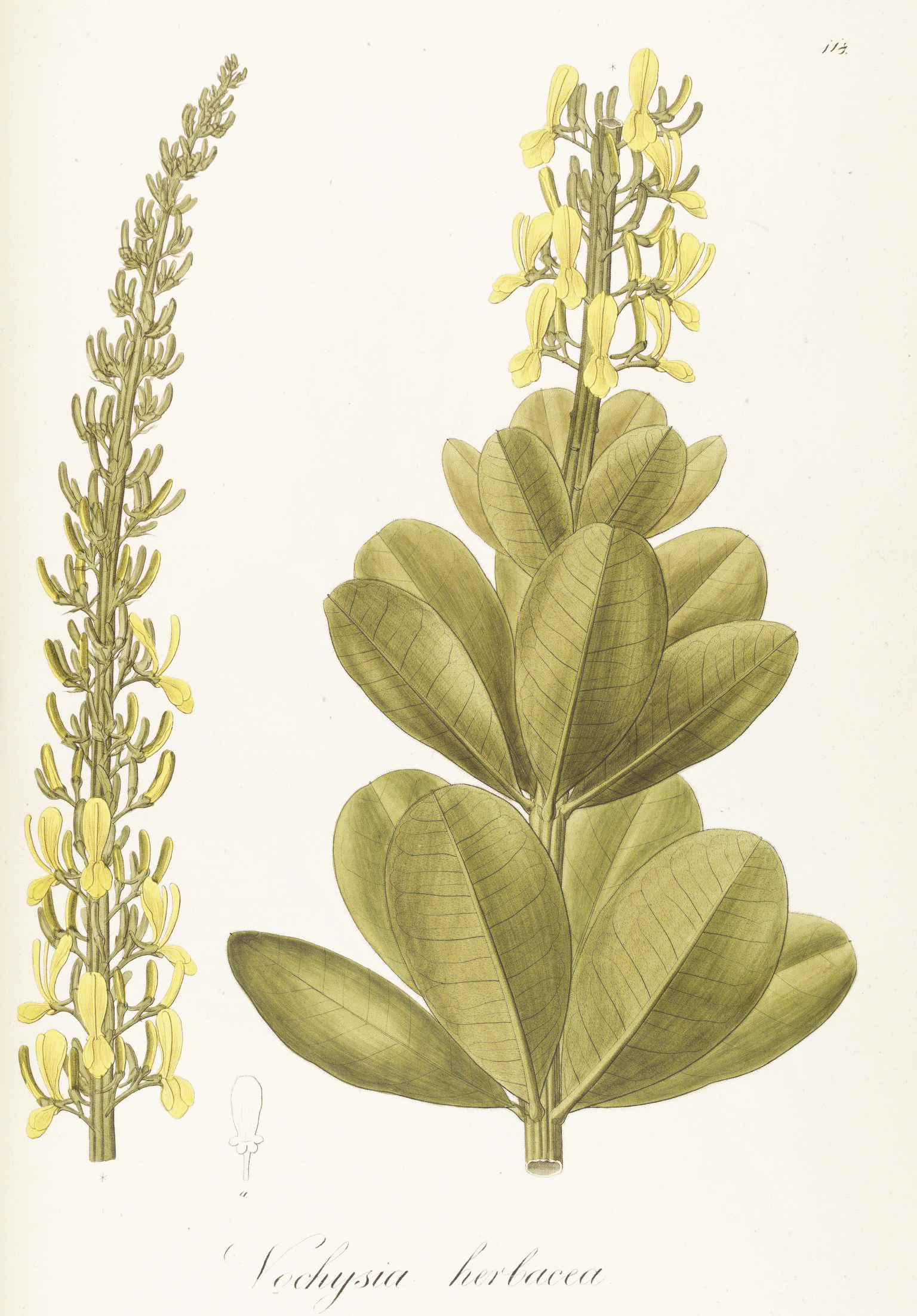
- Vochysia herbacea

Scientific classification
- Kingdom: Plantae
- Clade: Embryophytes
- Clade: Tracheophytes
- Clade: Spermatophytes
- Clade: Angiosperms
- Clade: Eudicots
- Clade: Rosids
- Order: Myrtales
- Family: Vochysiaceae; A.St.-Hil.

Genera
- Callisthene Mart.; Erisma Rudge; Erismadelphus Mildbr.; Korupodendron Litt & Cheek; Mahechadendron W.Ariza, Cortés-Ballén & Fern.Alonso; Qualea Aubl.; Ruizterania Marc.-Berti; Salvertia A.St.-Hil.; Vochysia Aubl.

= Vochysiaceae =

Family of flowering plants

Vochysiaceae is a plant family belonging to the order Myrtales.

== Description ==
Trees or shrubs with opposite leaves; flowers are zygomorph 1-(3)-5 merous; ovary inferior or superior; one fertile stamen; fruits samara or capsules.

== Biogeography ==
Seven of the nine genera are native to the Neotropics. The genera Erismadelphus and Korupodendron are native to West and Central Africa.

== Evolutionary history ==
The family likely originated in South America. Erismadelphus is thought to have diverged from Erisma approximately 30 million years ago, and traveled to Africa as the result of long-distance dispersal.

== Systematics ==
Vochysiaceae are closest to Myrtaceae. Vochysiaceae consist of 9 genera with about 250 species. The family is classified into two tribes:

Tribe Erismeae : one inferior ovary and winged fruits

- Erisma Rudge (21 species)
- Erismadelphus Mildbr. (2 species)
- Korupodendron Litt & Cheek (1 species)

Tribe Vochysieae: three fused superior ovaries and capsule fruits

- Callisthene Mart. (8 species)
- Qualea Aubl. (53 species)
- Mahechadendron W.Ariza, Cortés-Ballén & Fern.Alonso (1 species)
- Ruizterania Marc.-Bert. (14 species)
- Salvertia A.St.-Hil. (1 species)
- Vochysia Aubl. (148 species)

The genus Euphronia, previously included in Vochysiaceae, is unrelated and now stands alone in the family Euphroniaceae, more closely related to the family Chrysobalanaceae.
