= List of plants of Caatinga vegetation of Brazil =

This is a list of plants found in the wild in Caatinga vegetation of Brazil.

== Acanthaceae ==
- Anisacanthus brasiliensis Lindau
- Anisacanthus trilobus Lindau
- Lophostachys floribunda Ness
- Ruellia asperula Benth. & Hook.f.
- Ruellia geminiflora Kunth

== Amaranthaceae ==
- Alternanthera brasiliana (L.) Kuntze
- Alternanthera moquini (Webb ex Moq.) Dusen
- Gomphrena reticulata Seub.
- Gomphrena prostrata Mart.
- Iresine polymorpha Mart.

== Anacardiaceae ==
- Myracrodruon urundeuva M.Allemão
- Schinopsis brasiliensis Engl.
- Schinus terebinthifolius Raddi
- Spondias tuberosa Arruda

== Annonaceae ==
- Annona coriacea Mart.
- Annona glabra Forssk.
- Annona spinescens Mart.
- Xylopia frutescens Aubl.

== Apocynaceae ==
- Allamanda anothearifolia A.DC.
- Allamanda blanchetii A.DC.
- Allamanda puberula A.DC.
- Aspidosperma polyneuron Müll.Arg.
- Aspidosperma pyricollum Müll.Arg.
- Aspidosperma pyrifolium Mart., syn. Aspidosperma populifolium A.DC.
- Condylocarpon isthmicum = Condylocarpus ishtimicum (Vell.) A.DC.
- Hancornia speciosa Gomes
- Himatanthus lancifolia (Müll.Arg.) Woodson
- Odontadenia lutea (Vell.) Markgr.
- Peschiera affinis (Müll.Arg.) Miers

== Arecaceae ==
- Acrocomia aculeata (Jacq.) Lodd. ex Mart.
- Cocos capitata Mart.
- Syagrus coronata (Mart.) Becc.
- Syagrus comosa Mart.
- Syagrus flexuosa Mart. Becc.

== Aristolochiaceae ==
- Aristolochia allemanii Hoehne
- Aristolochia brasiliensis Mart. et Zucc.
- Aristolochia cymbifera Mart. et Zucc.
- Aristolochia cordigera Willd. ex Klotzsch
- Aristolochia galeata Mart. et Zucc.
- Aristolochia gigantea Mart. et Zucc.

== Asteraceae ==
- Acanthospermum australe (Loef.) O. Kunze
- Acanthospermum hispidum DC.
- Dasyphyllum brasiliensis
- Eupatorium amygdalinum Lam.
- Eupatorium bracteatum Gardn.
- Eupatorium laevis DC.
- Gochnatia amplexifolia (Gardn.) Cabr.
- Gochnatia blanchetiana (DC.) Cabr.
- Mikania cordifolia Willd.
- Mikania macrophylla Schultz. Bip.
- Mikania reticulata DC.
- Parthenium histerophorus L.
- Spilanthes acmella L.
- Vanillosmopsis brasiliensis
- Vernonia ligulaeflora Less.
- Vernonia polyanthes Less.
- Vernonia scorpioides Pers.

== Bignoniaceae ==
- Alsocydia erubescens Mart. ex DC.
- Anemopaegma glaucum Mart.
- Arrabidea rotundata Bur.
- Arrabidea trichoclata Burr.
- Batocydia unguis Mart.
- Cuspidaria cordata Maltos
- Distictes mansoana Pers.
- Friedericia speciosa Mart.
- Handroanthus impetiginosus
- Jacaranda brasiliana Pers.
- Jacaranda caroba DC.
- Jacaranda cuspidifolia Mart.
- Jacaranda elegans Mart.
- Lundia nitidula Mart.
- Pyrostegia venusta (Ker-Gavahl) Miers.
- Tabebuia avellanedae Lorentz et Giseb.
- Tabebuia caraiba (Mart.) Bur.
- Tabebuia chrysotricha (Mart. ex DC.) Stand.
- Tabebuia geminiflora Rizz. & Mattos

== Bombacaceae ==
- Cavanillesia arborea (Willd.) K. Schum
- Chorisia ventricosa Mart.
- Ceiba jasminodora K. Schum.
- Ceiba pentandra Gaertn.
- Ceiba rivieri K. Schum.

== Boraginaceae ==
- Auxemma glazioviana Taub.
- Auxemma oncocalyx Taub.
- Cordia insignis Cham.
- Cordia leucocephala Moric.
- Cordia nodosa Lam.
- Cordia trichotoma (Vell.) Mart.
- Heliotropium claussenii DC.
- Heliotropium laceolatum Loefg.

== Bromeliaceae ==
- Aechmea bromeliifolia Mart.
- Bromelia laciniosa
- Neoglaziovia variegata Mez.

== Burseraceae ==
- Bursera leptophloeus (Mart.) Engl.
- Protium heptaphyllum Mart.

== Cactaceae ==
- Brasilicereus brevifolius Ritter
- Cereus jamacaru DC.
- Cereus lindmanianus Bruin & Bred
- Cereus squamosus Guerck.
- Coleocephalocereus aureus Ritter
- Coleocephalocereus pupureus Bruin & Bred
- Melanocactus azureus Bruin & Bred
- Melanocactus bahiensis (Br. & R.) Werderm
- Melanocactus goniodacanthus Lem.
- Melanocactus leusselinkianus Brin & bred.
- Melanocactus oreas Miq.
- Opuntia inamoema K. Schum.
- Opuntia monacantha Haw.
- Pereskia aculeata Mill.
- Pereskia aureiflora Ritter
- Pereskia quiabenta Gurcke
- Pilocereus cenepequei Rizz & Mattos
- Pilocereus glaucescens (Lab.) Byl. & Powl.
- Pilocereus magnificus (Bui & Breel) Ritter
- Pilocereus multicostatus Ritter
- Quiabentia zehntneri (Br. et Ros.) Br. et Ros.
- Rhodocactus bahiensis (Gürke) I.Asai & K.Miyata

== Caesalpinioideae ==
- Apuleia leiocarpa (Vog.) Macbr.
- Bauhinia acureana Moric.
- Bauhinia cheilanta (Bong.) Steud.
- Bauhinia coronata Benth.
- Bauhinia forficata Link.
- Bauhinia microphylla Vog.
- Bauhinia pulchella Benth.
- Bauhinia radiana Vell.
- Bauhinia rubiginosa Bong.
- Bauhinia scadens Benth.
- Caesalpinia bracteosa Tul.
- Caesalpinia ferrea Mart ex Tul.
- Caesalpinia microphylla Mart.
- Caesalpinia pyramidalis Tul.
- Cassia ferruginea (Schrad.) DC.
- Cassia sericea Swartz
- Cenostigma gardneriana Tul.
- Copaifera martii Hayne
- Senna alata (L.) Irwin & Barneby
- Senna excelsa (Schrad) Irwin & Barneby
- Senna martiana (Schrad) Irwin & Barneby
- Senna multijuga (Rich.) Irwin & Barneby
- Senna speciosa (Schrad) Irwin & Barneby

== Cannabaceae ==
- Trema micrantha (L.) Blume

== Capparaceae ==
- Capparis flexuosa L.
- Cleome affinis L.
- Cleome spinosa Jacq.

== Cecropiaceae ==
- Cecropia hololeuca Miq.

== Celastraceae ==
- Maytenus obtusifolia Mart.
- Maytenus rigida Mart.

== Chrysobalanaceae ==
- Hirtella americana Aubl.
- Hirtella glandulosa Spreng.
- Hirtella martiana Hook.
- Microdesmia rigida Mart.

== Clusiaceae ==
- Rheedia gardneriana Lindl. & Trin.

== Cochlospermaceae ==
- Cochlospermum insigne A.St.-Hil.

== Combretaceae ==
- Combretum lanceolatum Pohl.
- Combretum elegans Camb.
- Combretum leprosum Mart.
- Combretum monetaria Mart.

== Convolvulaceae ==
- Evolvulus glomeratus Ness
- Evolvulus pusillus Choisy
- Ipomoea acuminata Roem. & Schl.
- Ipomoea aristolochiaefolia (H.B.K.) Don.
- Ipomoea daturaefolia Meisn.
- Ipomoea cairica (L.) Sweet.
- Ipomoea cynanchifolia (Meisn.) Mart.
- Ipomoea horrida Huber
- Ipomoea quamoclit L.
- Merremia aegyptia (L.) Urban
- Merremia cissoides (Lam.) Hallier
- Merremia macrocalyx (Ruiz & Pava) O'Donnel

== Cucurbitaceae ==
- Cucumis anguria L.
- Melothria fluminensis Gardn.
- Sicana odorifera Naud.
- Trianosperma tayuya Mart.

== Dilleniaceae ==
- Davilla rugosa Poit.

== Euphorbiaceae ==
- Croton antisyphiliticus Mart.
- Croton campestris A.St.-Hil.
- Croton hemiargyrus Mull. Arg.
- Croton lundianus (Dried.) M. Arg.
- Croton sondterianus M. Arg.
- Croton zenhtneri Pax. & Hoffm.
- Dalechampia scandens L.
- Euphorbia phosphorea Mart.
- Jatropha osteocarpa M. Arg.
- Jatropha urens (L.) M. Arg.
- Julocroton furcescens (Spreng.) Baill.
- Julocroton humilis Diedr.
- Julocroton lanceolatus M. Arg.
- Julocroton triqueter M. Arg.
- Manihot glaziovii M. Arg.
- Manihot stipularis M. Arg.
- Stillingia argudentata Jabl.

== Faboideae ==
- Abrus precatorius L.
- Aeschynomene brasiliana (Poir.) DC.
- Aeschynomene evenia Whigh.
- Aeschynomene falcata (Poir.) DC.
- Aeschynomene histrix Poir.
- Aeschynomene gilbertoi Brandão
- Aeschynomene laca-buendiana Brandão
- Aeschynomene martii Benth.
- Aeschynomene paniculata Vog.
- Aeschynomene paucifolia Vog.
- Aeschynomene riedeliana Taub.
- Aeschynomene selloi Vog.
- Arachis prostata Benth.
- Arachis pusilla Benth.
- Browdichia virgilioides H.B.K.
- Calopogonium coeruleum Hemsl.
- Calopogonium mucunoides Desv.
- Camptosema tomentosum Benth.
- Centrobium robustum (Vell.) Mart.
- Centrosema angustifolium Benth.
- Centrosema arenarium Benth.
- Centrosema brasilianum (L.) Benth.
- Centrosema dasyanthum Benth.
- Centrosema macranthum Hoehne
- Centrosema plumerii (Turp. ex Pres.) Benth.
- Centrosema pubescens Benth.
- Centrosema sagittatum (Willd.) Brad.
- Centrosema vexillatum Benth.
- Coursetia rostrata Benth.
- Cratylia floribunda Benth.
- Cratylia mollis Mart.
- Cratylia nuda Tul.
- Crotalaria anagyroides H.B.K.
- Crotalaria incana Benth.
- Crotalaria retusa L.
- Crotalaria pallida Ait.
- Dalbergia decipularis Rizz. & Mattos
- Dalbergia euxylophora
- Desmodium adscendens DC.
- Desmodium discolor Vog.
- Desmodium molle DC.
- Desmodium spirale DC.
- Dioclea grandiflora Mart.
- Eriosema crinitum Benth.
- Eriosema heterophyllum Benth.
- Erythrina mulungu Mart.
- Erythrina velutina Willd.
- Galactia rhynchosioides A.St.-Hil.
- Galactia tenuiflora Whrigt et Ann.
- Geoffraea spinosa Jacq.
- Indigofera suffruticosa Mill.
- Machaerium angustifolium Vog.
- Machaerium scleroxylum Tul.
- Macriptilium bracteolatus (Nees & Mart.) Urb.
- Macriptilium firmulus (Mart.) Urban
- Macriptilium gracilis (Poep. & Benth.) Urban
- Macriptilium lathyroides (L.) Urb. ex Marech
- Macriptilium panduratus (Mart. ex Benth.) Urb.
- Macriptilium sabaraense (Hoehne) V. P. Barbosa
- Playmiscium blancheti Benth.
- Playmiscium nitens Vog.
- Rhynchosia exaltata DC.
- Rhynchosia minima DC.
- Rhynchosia phaseoloides DC.
- Rhynchosia senna Gill.
- Stizolobium deeringianum Bort.
- Stylosanthes capitata Vog.
- Stylosanthes gracilis H.B.K.
- Stylosanthes grandiflora Ferr. & Costa
- Stylosanthes guianensis (Aubl.) Sw.
- Stylosanthes macrocephala Ferr. & Costa
- Stylosanthes pilosa Ferr. & Costa
- Stylosanthes scabra Vog.
- Teramnus volubilis Sw.
- Teramnus uncinatus Sw.
- Zolernia ilicifolia Vog.
- Zornia acauensis Brandão & Costa
- Zornia brasiliensis Vog.
- Zornia crinita (Mohl.)Vanni
- Zornia curvata Mohl.
- Zornia flemingioides Moric.
- Zornia gardneriana Moric.
- Zornia gemella Mohl.
- Zornia latifolia Sm.
- Zornia mitziana Costa
- Zornia myriadena Benth.
- Zornia pardiana Mohl.

== Flacourtiaceae ==
- Casearia commersiana
- Casearia guianensis Urb.
- Casearia rufens Camb.
- Xylosma salzmanni Eich.

== Hippocrateaceae ==
- Salacia elliptica (Mart.) Peyr.

== Hydrophyllaceae ==
- Hydrangea spinosa L.

== Lamiaceae ==
- Hyptis lanceolata Poir.
- Hyptis lantanaefolia Poir.
- Hyptis multiflora Pohl.
- Hyptis pectinata Poir.
- Hyptis suaveolens Poir.
- Ocimum fliminensis Vell.
- Ocimum incanescens Mart.
- Peltodon radicans Pohl.

== Lauraceae ==
- Ocotea variabilis Meisn.

== Loganiaceae ==
- Spigelia anthelmia L.

== Loranthaceae ==
- Pithirusa sp.
- Psitacanthus robustus Mart.

== Lythraceae ==
- Ammannia coccinea Roth.
- Cuphea lutescens Hoehne
- Cuphea speciosa Mart.
- Diplusodon rotundifolia DC.

== Malpighiaceae ==
- Banisteriopsis oxyclada (A. Juss.) Gates
- Banisteriopsis pubipetala (A. Juss.) Gates
- Banisteriopsis stellaris (Gris.) Gates
- Byrsonima crassifolia A. Juss.
- Byrsonima sericea A. Juss.
- Byrsonima variabilis A. Juss.
- Byrsonima verbascifolia A. Juss.
- Mascagnia rigida Gris. Juss.
- Stigmaphyllon urenifolium A. Juss.

== Malvaceae ==
- Bourgenhadia nemoralis (A.St.-Hil.) Monteiro
- Gaya gracilipes K. Schum.
- Gaya pilosa K. Schum.

== Melastomataceae ==
- Miconia chamissonis Naud.
- Mouriria guianensis Aubl.
- Mouriria pusa Gardn.
- Tibouchina stenoccarpa Cogn.

== Meliaceae ==
- Cabralea cangerana (Vell.) Mart.
- Cedrela fissilis Vel.
- Guarea trichilioides L.
- Trichilia columata Guardi

== Mimosoideae ==
- Acacia farnesiana Willd.
- Acacia paniculata Willd.
- Adenanthera pavonina L.
- Anadenanthera contorta (Benth.) Brenan
- Anadenanthera falcata (Benth.) Brenan
- Anadenanthera macrocarpa (Benth.) Brenan
- Anadenanthera peregrina (Benth.) Brenan
- Calliandra depauperata Benth.
- Calliandra leptopoda Benth.
- Calliandra macrocalyx Harms.
- Calliandra myriophylla Benth.
- Calliandra peckoltii Benth.
- Calliandra speciosa Ducke
- Calliandra turbinata Benth.
- Calliandra viscidula Benth.
- Desmanthus virgatus Benth.
- Enterolobium contortisiliquum (Vell.) Morong
- Inga bahiensis Benth.
- Inga edulis Mart.
- Inga marginata Willd.
- Mimosa caesalpinaefolia Benth.
- Mimosa hostilis Benth.
- Mimosa malacocentra Mart. ex Benth.
- Mimosa modesta Mart.
- Mimosa pigra L.
- Mimosa pteridifolia Benth.
- Mimosa sepiaria Benth.
- Mimosa velloziana
- Mimosa ursina Mart.
- Mimosa verrucosa Benth.
- Pithecellobium avaremoto Mart.
- Pithecellobium diversifolium Benth.
- Pithecellobium dumosum Benth.
- Pithecellobium foliolosum Benth.
- Pithecellobium inopinatum (Harms.) Dicke
- Pithecellobium multiflorum Benth.
- Platymenia reticulata Benth.
- Pterogyne nitens Tul.
- Schrankia leptocarpha DC.
- Stryphnodendron coriaceum Benth.

== Myrsinaceae ==
- Rapanea guianensis Aubl.

== Myrtaceae ==
- Campomanesia adamantium Blume
- Campomanesia corymbosa Blume
- Eugenia stictopetapa DC.
- Psidium araao Raddi

== Nyctaginaceae ==
- Bougainvillea fasciculata Brandão
- Bougainvillea glabra Choisy
- Bougainvillea spectabilis Willd.

== Ochnaceae ==
- Ouratea parviflora Baill.
- Ouratea spectabilis (Mart.) Spreng.

== Orchidaceae ==
- Catasetum sp.
- Habenaria sp.
- Oncidium sp.

== Oxalidaceae ==
- Oxalis nigrescens A.St.-Hil.

== Passifloraceae ==
- Passiflora cincinnata Masters
- Passiflora digitata L.
- Passiflora foetida L.
- Passiflora gardneri Masters
- Passiflora kermesina Link & Otto (=Passiflora raddiana DC.)
- Passiflora rubra L.
- Passiflora serratodigitata L.
- Passiflora tenuifila Killip.

== Phytolaccaceae ==
- Gallezia gorazema Moq.

== Piperaceae ==
- Piper angustifolium Ruiz & Pav.
- Pothomorphe peltata Miq.

== Plumbaginaceae ==
- Plumbago scandens L.

== Poaceae ==
- Andropogon bicornis L.
- Andropogon leucostachys H.B.K.
- Aristida adscensionis L.
- Aristida pallens Cav.
- Axonopus cpmpressus Beauv.
- Cenchrus echinatus L.
- Dactyloctenium aegyptium (L.) Beauv.
- Digitaria insularis (L.) Benth.
- Eleusine indica (L.) Gaetrn.
- Eragrotis pilosa (L.) Beauv.
- Hyparrhenia rufa (Ness) Stapf.
- Merostachys riedelliana Rop.
- Paspalum notatum Flugge
- Pennisetum setosum (Sw.) L. Rich.
- Rhynchelitrum repens (Willd.) Hubbard.
- Sporobolus argutas Kunth.

== Portulacaceae ==
- Portulaca oleracea L.
- Portulaca pilosa L.
- Talinum patens
- Talinum triangulare (Jacq.) Willd.

== Polygalaceae ==
- Bredemeyera floribunda Willd.
- Bredemeyera brevifolia (Benth.) Brenan
- Polygala cuspidata DC.
- Polygala hebeclada
- Polygala longicaulis H.B.K
- Polygala urbanii Chod.
- Secondatia floribunda A. DC.

== Polygonaceae ==
- Polygonum acre L.
- Polygonum hidropiperoides Michx.
- Polygonum hispidium H.B.K.
- Polygonum spectabilis Mart.
- Tripalis pachau Mart.

== Rhamnaceae ==
- Celtis iguanea (Jacq.) Planch.
- Reissekia smilacina Endl.
- Zizyphus joazeiro Mart.

== Rubiaceae ==
- Genipa americana L.
- Guettarda angelica Mart.
- Mannetia ignita K. Schum.
- Mitracarpus hirtus (L.) DC.
- Palicoures marcgravii A.St.-Hil.
- Pectis brevipedunculata (Gardn.) Sch. Bip.
- Randia armata (Sw.) DC.
- Tocoyena formosa Schum.

== Rutaceae ==
- Galipa jasminifolia

== Sapindaceae ==
- Cardiospermum grandiflorum Sw.
- Cardiospermum halicacabum
- Paulinia elegans Camb.
- Sapindus saponaria L.
- Serjanea lethalis A.St.-Hil.
- Serjanea mansiana Mart.
- Serjanea paucidentata Radlk
- Urvillea ulmacea H.B.K.

== Sapotaceae ==
- Bumelia startorum Mart.

== Scrophulariaceae ==
- Scoparia dulcis L.

== Selaginellaceae ==
- Selaginella convoluta (Walk.& Arnoff) Spreng.

== Simarubaceae ==
- Simaruba versicolor A.St.-Hil.

== Solanaceae ==
- Acnistus arborescens
- Datura fastuosa L.
- Solanum erianthum Don.
- Solanum horridum Don.
- Solanum paniculatum L.

== Sterculiaceae ==
- Guazuma ulmifolia Lam.
- Melochia hermanoides A.St.-Hil.
- Melochia villosa (Mill.) Farwc.
- Sterculia striata A.St.-Hil. et Naud.
- Waltheria bracteosa A.St.-Hil. et Naud.

== Styracaceae ==
- Styrax parvifolium Pohl.

== Tiliaceae ==
- Apeiba tibourbou Aubl.
- Luehea candicans Mart.
- Luehea divaricataMart.

== Turneraceae ==
- Piriqueta aurea (Camb.) Urban
- Pirequeta duarteana (Camb.) Juss.
- Turnera melochioides Camb.
- Turnera ulmifolia L.

== Urticaceae ==
- Fleurya aestuans Gaudich.
- Urera baccifera Gaudich.

== Verbenaceae ==
- Aegiphylla sellowiana Cham.
- Lantana camara L.
- Lantana lilaciana Desf.
- Lantana microphylla L.

== Violaceae ==
- Anchietea saluataris A.St.-Hil.

== Vitaceae ==
- Cissus erosa L. C. Rich.
- Cissus scabra
- Cissus sicyoides L.
- Cissus warmingii

== Vochysiaceae ==
- Callistene major Mart.
- Qualea parviflora Mart.
- Vochysia tucanorum Mart.

== See also ==
- List of plants of Amazon Rainforest vegetation of Brazil
- List of plants of Atlantic Forest vegetation of Brazil
- List of plants of Cerrado vegetation of Brazil
- List of plants of Pantanal vegetation of Brazil
- Official list of endangered flora of Brazil
