= Catuabo =

- Village
- Location of Frei Paulo in Sergipe

- Location within Brazil
- Coordinates: 10°27′39″S 37°33′0″W
- Country: Brazil
- State: Sergipe
- Municipality: Frei Paulo
- Elevation: 290 m (950 ft)
- Population (2022): 569

Catuabo (Brazilian Portuguese pronunciation: [katʊˈɐbʊ]) is a village and quilombo in the municipality of Frei Paulo, state of Sergipe, in northeastern Brazil. As of 2022, it had a population of 569. The name of the village is a variant of the Portuguese word "catuaba", a plant of the Anemopaegma glaucum species.

== See also ==
- List of villages in Sergipe
