= Stigmaphyllon ecuadorense =

Conservation status
- Endangered (IUCN 3.1)

Scientific classification
- Kingdom: Plantae
- Clade: Tracheophytes
- Clade: Angiosperms
- Clade: Eudicots
- Clade: Rosids
- Order: Malpighiales
- Family: Malpighiaceae
- Genus: Stigmaphyllon
- Species: S. ecuadorense

Binomial name
- Stigmaphyllon ecuadorense C.E.Anderson

Species of plant

Stigmaphyllon ecuadorense is a species of plant in the Malpighiaceae family. It is a vine endemic to Ecuador. Its natural habitat is subtropical or tropical moist lowland forests.
