= Stigmaphyllon australiense =

- Herbarium specimen

Conservation status
- Least Concern (NCA)

Scientific classification
- Kingdom: Plantae
- Clade: Tracheophytes
- Clade: Angiosperms
- Clade: Eudicots
- Clade: Rosids
- Order: Malpighiales
- Family: Malpighiaceae
- Genus: Stigmaphyllon
- Species: S. australiense

Binomial name
- Stigmaphyllon australiense C.E.Anderson

Synonyms
- Ryssopterys australiensis Nied.

Species of flowering plant

Stigmaphyllon australiense is a species of plant in the family Malpighiaceae native to Queensland, Australia. It is a woody vine with a stem up to 5 cm (2.0 in) diameter. It grows in monsoon forest and vine thickets from Cape York to Central Queensland, from sea level up to 1,000 m (3,300 ft). It was first described as Ryssopterys australiensis by German botanist Franz Josef Niedenzu in 1911. In 2011, Christiane Eva Anderson transferred the genus Ryssopterys to Stigmaphyllon, resulting in the current combination for this species.

The species has a conservation status of least concern.
