= Apeiba intermedia =

Conservation status
- Data Deficient (IUCN 2.3)

Scientific classification
- Kingdom: Plantae
- Clade: Tracheophytes
- Clade: Angiosperms
- Clade: Eudicots
- Clade: Rosids
- Order: Malvales
- Family: Malvaceae
- Genus: Apeiba
- Species: A. intermedia

Binomial name
- Apeiba intermedia Uittien

Species of flowering plant

Apeiba intermedia is a species of flowering plant in the family Malvaceae sensu lato or in Tiliaceae or Sparrmanniaceae family. It is found only in Suriname.
