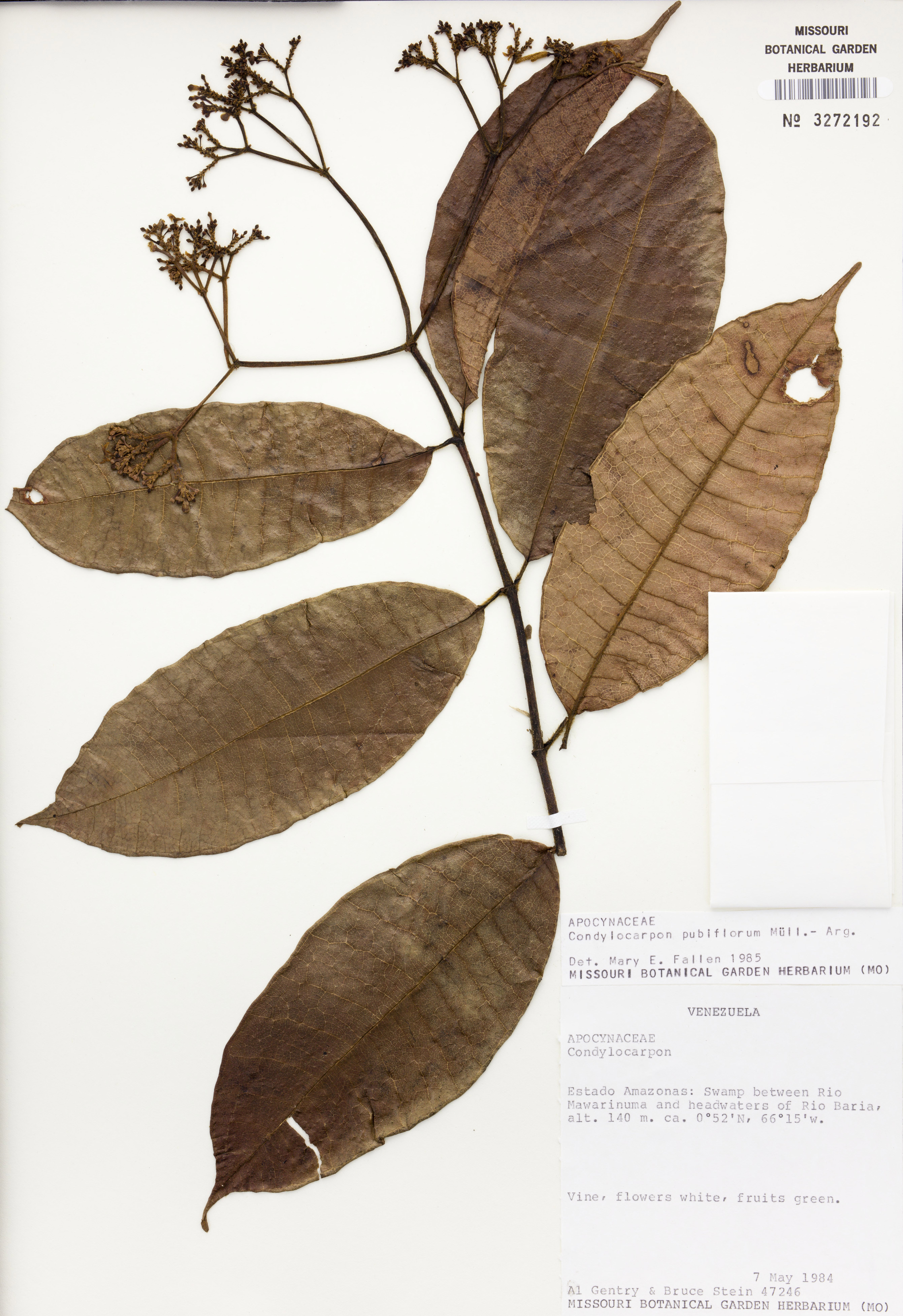
- Herbarium specimen of Condylocarpon pubiflorum.

Scientific classification
- Kingdom: Plantae
- Clade: Tracheophytes
- Clade: Angiosperms
- Clade: Eudicots
- Clade: Asterids
- Order: Gentianales
- Family: Apocynaceae
- Genus: Condylocarpon
- Species: C. pubiflorum

Binomial name
- Condylocarpon pubiflorum Müll.Arg.

Synonyms
- Condylocarpon ciliatum Müll.Arg.; Condylocarpon hirtellum Ducke; Hortsmania ciliate Benth. ex Müll.Arg. Hortsmania pubiflora; Benth. ex Müll.Arg.

= Condylocarpon pubiflorum =

Species of flowering plant

Condylocarpon pubiflorum is a species of plant in the Apocynaceae family. It is native to Bolivia, Brazil, Colombia, Peru and Venezuela. Johannes Müller Argoviensis, the botanist who first formally described the species, named it after an invalid nomen nudum, Hortsmania pubiflora, previously offered by George Bentham.

== Description ==
It is a large, woody, climbing plant. Its reddish-brown, slender, cylindrical, tapering branches have small gold-colored warty bumps, or sometimes lenticels. The branches are sparsely covered in coarse, golden-brown hairs. Its leaves occur in pairs, arranged opposite one another. Its membranous, elliptical to oblong leaves are 6.5–15 by 2.5–5 centimeters. The tips of its leaves taper to a narrow point. The tapered portions of the leaves are 5–10 millimeters long. The bases of the leaves are pointed to rounded. The glossy upper surfaces of the leaves are hairless, or have sparse, golden-brown coarse hairs. The lower surfaces of the leaves are paler, and are hairless or have sparse, golden-brown soft hairs. The leaves have midribs that are sunken on the upper surface and raised on the lower surface and covered in soft to velvety hairs on both surfaces. Its dark, grooved petioles are 2–6 millimeters long and covered in soft to coarse, golden-brown hairs. Its branched, many-flowered Inflorescences occur in terminal positions. Its inflorescences are covered in soft to velvety, golden-brown hairs. The branches of the inflorescences have gold-colored to orange-brown, triangular bracts that are covered in soft to velvety hairs. The flowers are on pedicels that are up to 2 millimeters long. Its flowers have 5 hairless, membranous sepals are fused at the base. The lobes of the sepals are egg-shaped. The 5 white to cream-colored petals are fused at their base to form a 1.5–2 by 1 tube that is constricted at the top and then expands abruptly into 2–5 by 1–2 millimeter spreading lobes. Its lance-shaped stamen are inserted near the top of the petal tube. Its conical ovaries are about 0.8 millimeters long, with styles that are 0.3 millimeters long. Its stigma are shaped like an inverted cone. Each carpels has about 16 ovules arranged in 4–5 rows. Its woody, fruit are divided into two long, sections that are covered in dense, soft, gold-colored hairs. Each section has several cylindrical segments containing one seed. Each seed segment is 20–25 by 2–3.5 millimeters.

=== Reproductive biology ===
The pollen of Condylocarpon pubiflorum is shed as permanent tetrads.

=== Distribution and habitat ===
It has been observed growing in forests that may sometimes flood growing at elevations of up to 350 meters.
