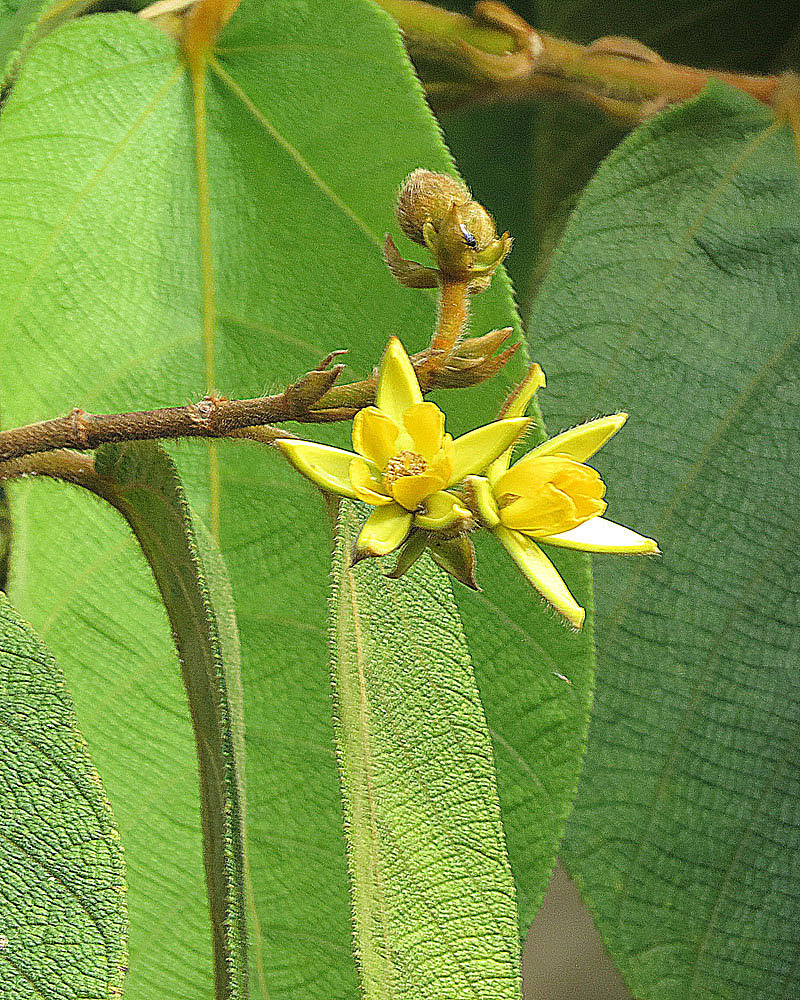
- Close up of flowers.

Scientific classification
- Kingdom: Plantae
- Clade: Tracheophytes
- Clade: Angiosperms
- Clade: Eudicots
- Clade: Rosids
- Order: Malvales
- Family: Malvaceae
- Genus: Apeiba
- Species: A. membranacea

Binomial name
- Apeiba membranacea Spruce ex Benth.

= Apeiba membranacea =

Species of tree

Apeiba membranacea is a species of tree in the family Malvaceae. It is native to Central and South America.
