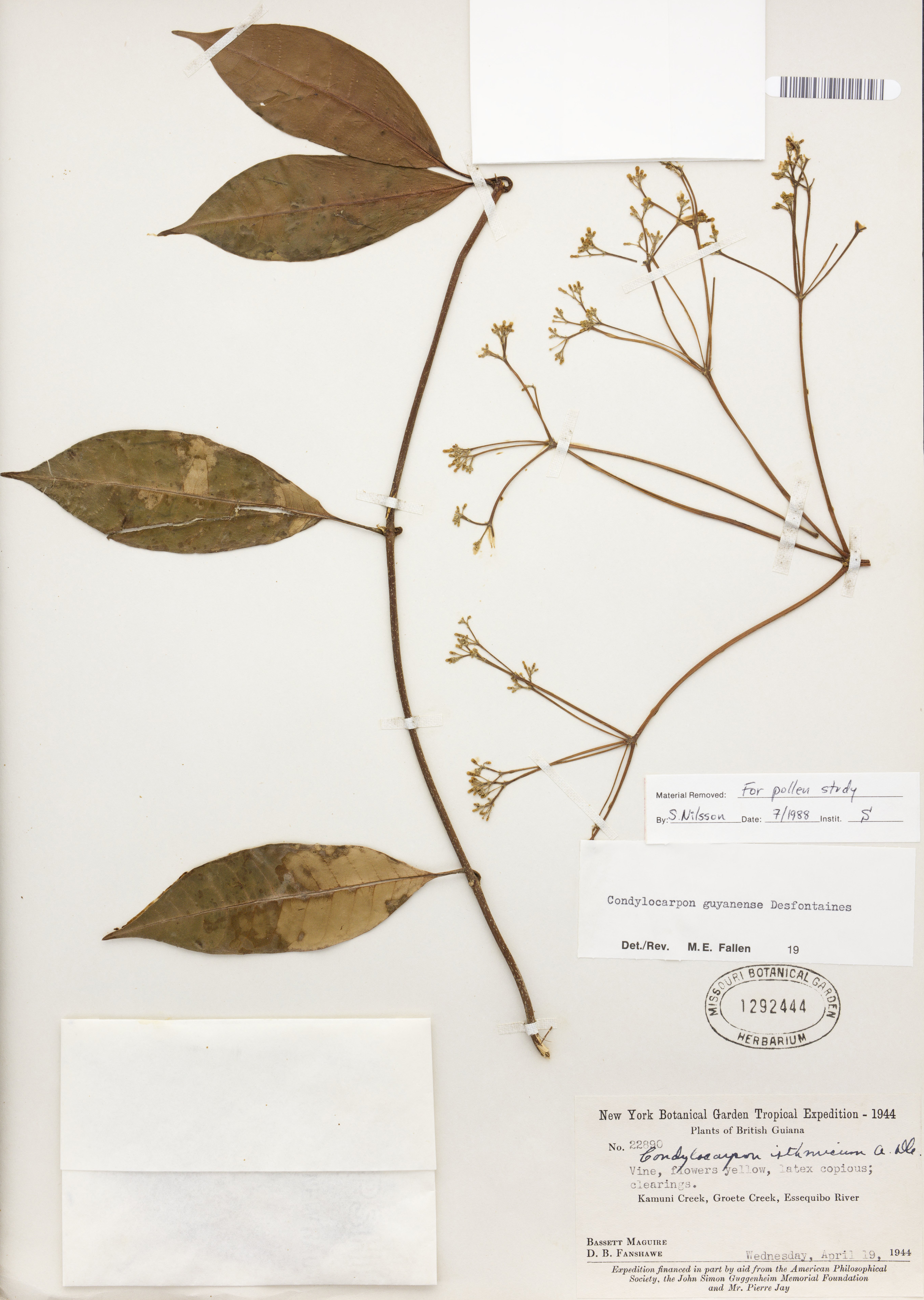
- Photograph of a herbarium specimen of Condylocarpon guyanense

Scientific classification
- Kingdom: Plantae
- Clade: Tracheophytes
- Clade: Angiosperms
- Clade: Eudicots
- Clade: Asterids
- Order: Gentianales
- Family: Apocynaceae
- Genus: Condylocarpon
- Species: C. guyanense

Binomial name
- Condylocarpon guyanense Desf.

= Condylocarpon guyanense =

Species of flowering plant

Condylocarpon guyanense is a species of plant in the Apocynaceae family. It is native to Brazil, French Guiana, and Guyana. René Louiche Desfontaines, the botanist who first formally described the species, named it after Guyana where Joseph Martin collected the specimen he examined.

== Description ==
It is a woody, climbing plant. Its reddish-brown, slender, cylindrical, tapering branches have lenticels. The young branches can be covered in soft hairs. Its leaves occur in groups of 3 per node. Its hairless, membranous to slightly leathery, elliptical to oblong leaves are 9–13 by 3–4.5 centimeters. The tips of its leaves taper to a narrow point, with the tapering portion 10 by 1.5–2.5 millimeters. The bases of the leaves are pointed. The leaves have 9–11 pairs of secondary veins emanating from their midribs. The midvein and secondary veins are sunken on the upper surfaces and raised on the undersides of the leaves. The tertiary veins on the underside of the leaves form a distinct networked pattern. Its petioles are 1.2–1.8 centimeters long and have groove and are slightly to densely covered in soft hairs. Its branched, many-flowered Inflorescences occur at the junction between the leaves and stem or in terminal positions. Its inflorescences are slightly to densely covered in soft hairs. The primary branches of the inflorescences are 4–6 centimeters long with bracts that are 1 millimeter long, with pointed tips and fringed margins. Each flower is on a slender pedicels that is 3 millimeters long. Its flowers have 5 sepals with egg-shaped lobes that are covered in soft hairs and have densely fringed margins. The 5 cream-colored to orange petals are fused at their base to form a 1.5 by 0.6–0.8 millimeter tube that constricts at the top and then expands abruptly into 1 by 0.5 millimeter spreading lobes. The petal lobes have strap-shaped appendages at their tips. The base of the lobes have brown marks. Its lance-shaped stamen are inserted half-way up the tube of the petals. Its pistils have cone-shaped ovaries that are 0.5 millimeters long. The ovaries have 2 carpels. Each carpels have 4-5 ovules arranged in two rows. Its stigma are orb-shaped. Its woody, red-brown, hairless fruit are divided into two long, thin sections that are each 15–25 by 7 millimeters. Each section has up to 5 segments containing one seed. The fruit are marked with longitudinal lines, with a streak over the areas that contain seeds.

=== Reproductive biology ===
The pollen of Condylocarpon guyanense is shed as permanent tetrads.

=== Distribution and habitat ===
It has been observed growing in lowland forests.
