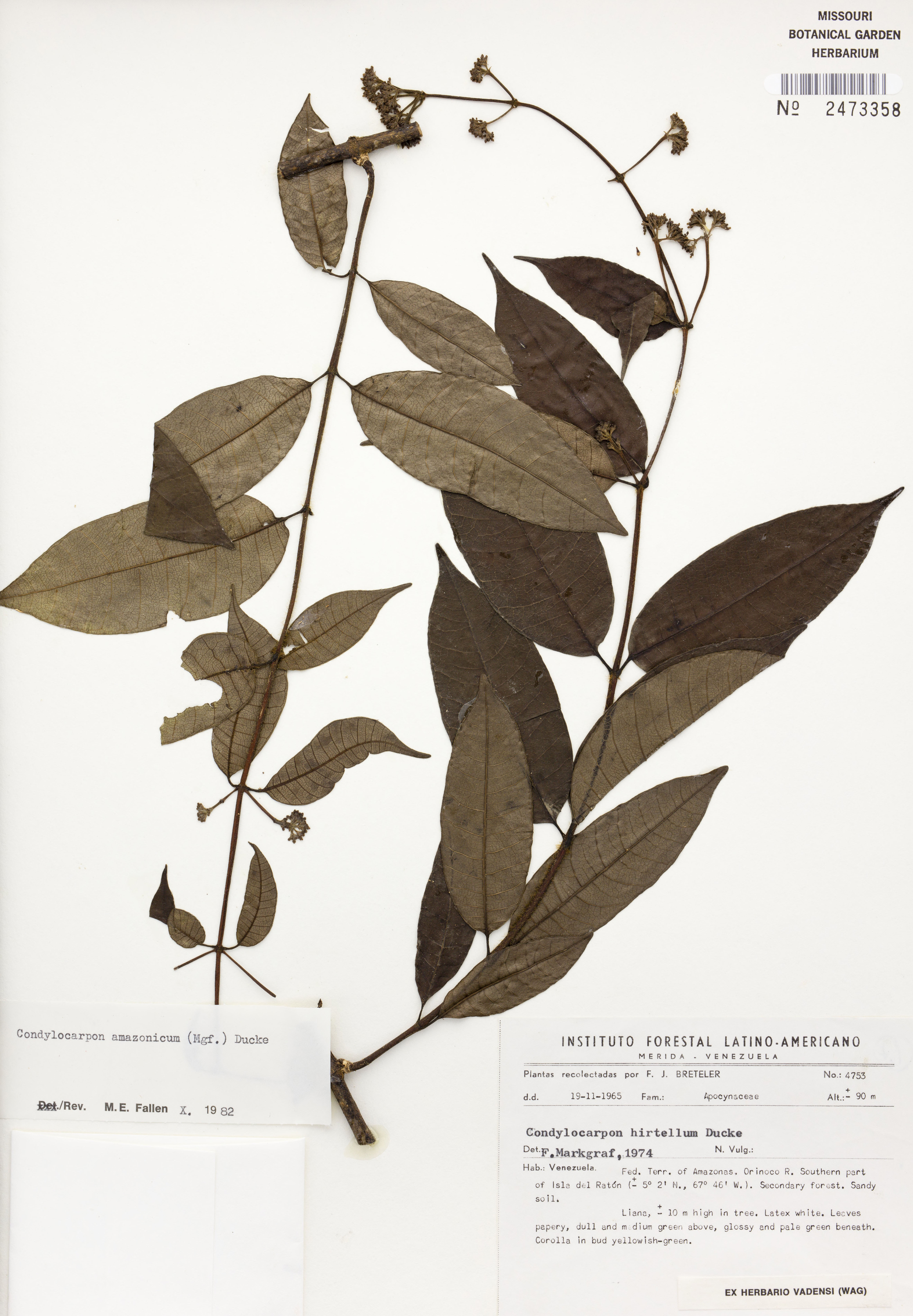
- Photograph of a herbarium specimen of Condylocarpon amazonicum

Scientific classification
- Kingdom: Plantae
- Clade: Tracheophytes
- Clade: Angiosperms
- Clade: Eudicots
- Clade: Asterids
- Order: Gentianales
- Family: Apocynaceae
- Genus: Condylocarpon
- Species: C. amazonicum

Binomial name
- Condylocarpon amazonicum (Markgr.) Ducke

Synonyms
- Anechites amazonicus Markgr.; Rhipidia amazonica (Markgr.) Markgr.; Condylocarpon occidentale Markgr.; Condylocarpon reticulatum Ducke

= Condylocarpon amazonicum =

Species of flowering plant

Condylocarpon amazonicum is a species of plant in the Apocynaceae family. It is native to Bolivia, Brazil, Suriname, and Venezuela. Friedrich Markgraf, the botanist who first formally described the species, using the basionym Anechites amazonicus, named it after the area near the Amazon River in Pará Brazil where the specimen he examined was collected by Adolpho Ducke.

== Description ==
It is a climbing plant. Its reddish-brown, slender, cylindrical, tapering branches have glistening, gold-colored warty bumps, and lenticels. The branches are slightly to densely covered in soft, gold-brown hairs. Its leaves are positioned opposite to one another. Its slightly leathery, broad lance-shaped leaves are 7–12 by 2.5–5 centimeters. The tips of its leaves are pointed or come to a tapering point. The bases of the leaves are blunt or have a cut-off shape. The top sides of the leaves are hairless to slightly hairy, and the lower sides are slightly hairy to densely covered in soft hairs. The leaves have 12–15 pairs of secondary veins emanating from their midribs. The midvein and secondary veins are elevated on the undersides of the leaves. Its black, hairless petioles are 0.5–1 centimeters long and have a shallow groove. Its many-flowered Inflorescences occur at the junction between the leaves and stem or in terminal positions. Its inflorescences are slightly to densely covered in reddish-brown soft to velvety hairs. Each flower is on a slender, slightly hairy pedicels that is 0.5–2 millimeters long. Its flowers have 5 sepals with egg-shaped to triangular lobes that are slightly to densely covered in soft hairs. The 5 greenish-white to cream-colored petals are fused at their base to form a 2 by 0.5–1 millimeter tube that constricts at the top and then expands abruptly into 1–1.8 by 0.7 millimeter spreading lobes. The petal lobes have blunt tips. Its egg-shaped stamen are inserted a little more than half-way up the tube of the petals. Its pistils have cone-shaped ovaries that are 0.6 millimeters long. The ovaries have 2 carpels. The carpels have 4 ovules arranged in two rows. Its stigma are shaped like an inverse-cone. Its woody fruit are divided into two long, thin sections that are each 10.5–15 centimeters long. The fruit are covered in velvety rust-colored to brown hairs that are 3–5 millimeters long. Only one seed develops in each section of the fruit. The seeds are 1.5 by 3 millimeters.

=== Reproductive biology ===
The pollen of Condylocarpon amazonicum is shed as permanent tetrads.

=== Distribution and habitat ===
It has been observed growing in secondary and riparian forests at elevations up to 90 meters.
