= Stryphnodendron porcatum =

Conservation status
- Least Concern (IUCN 3.1)

Scientific classification
- Kingdom: Plantae
- Clade: Tracheophytes
- Clade: Angiosperms
- Clade: Eudicots
- Clade: Rosids
- Order: Fabales
- Family: Fabaceae
- Subfamily: Caesalpinioideae
- Clade: Mimosoid clade
- Genus: Stryphnodendron
- Species: S. porcatum

Binomial name
- Stryphnodendron porcatum D.A.Neill & Occhioni f.

Species of legume

Stryphnodendron porcatum is a species of flowering plant in the family Fabaceae. It is found only in Ecuador. Its natural habitats are subtropical or tropical moist lowland forests and subtropical or tropical moist montane forests.
