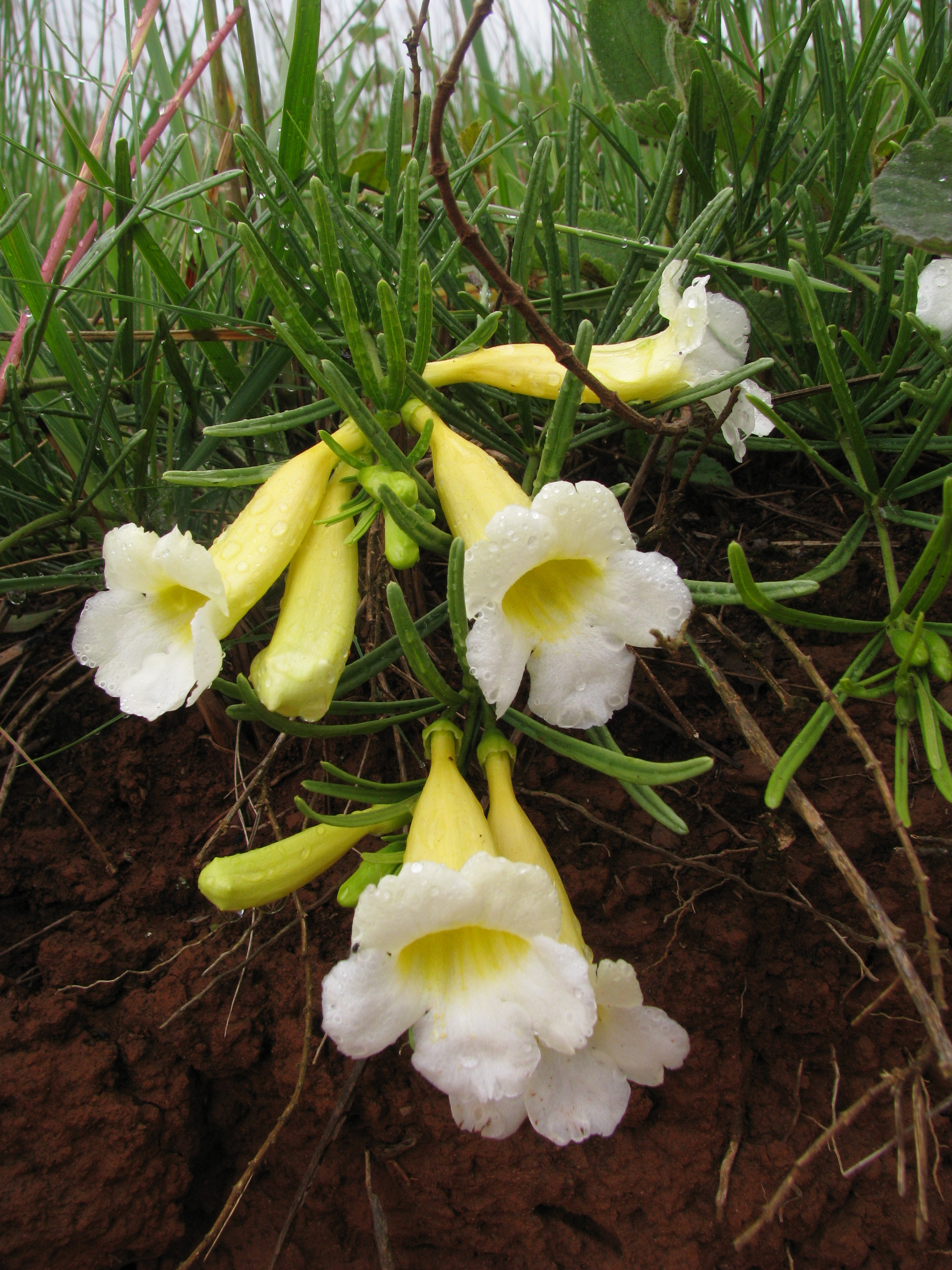

Scientific classification
- Kingdom: Plantae
- Clade: Tracheophytes
- Clade: Angiosperms
- Clade: Eudicots
- Clade: Asterids
- Order: Lamiales
- Family: Bignoniaceae
- Genus: Anemopaegma
- Species: A. arvense

Binomial name
- Anemopaegma arvense (Vell.) Stelff. ex Souza

Synonyms
- Anemopaegma mirandum (Cham.) Mart. ex DC.; Anemopaegma sessilifolium Mart. ex DC.; Anemopaegma subundulatum Bureau & K.Schum.; Bignonia arvensis Vell.; Bignonia miranda Cham.; Jacaranda arvensis (Vell.) Steud.

= Anemopaegma arvense =

Species of flowering plant

Anemopaegma arvense is a medicinal plant native to Cerrado in Brazil.
