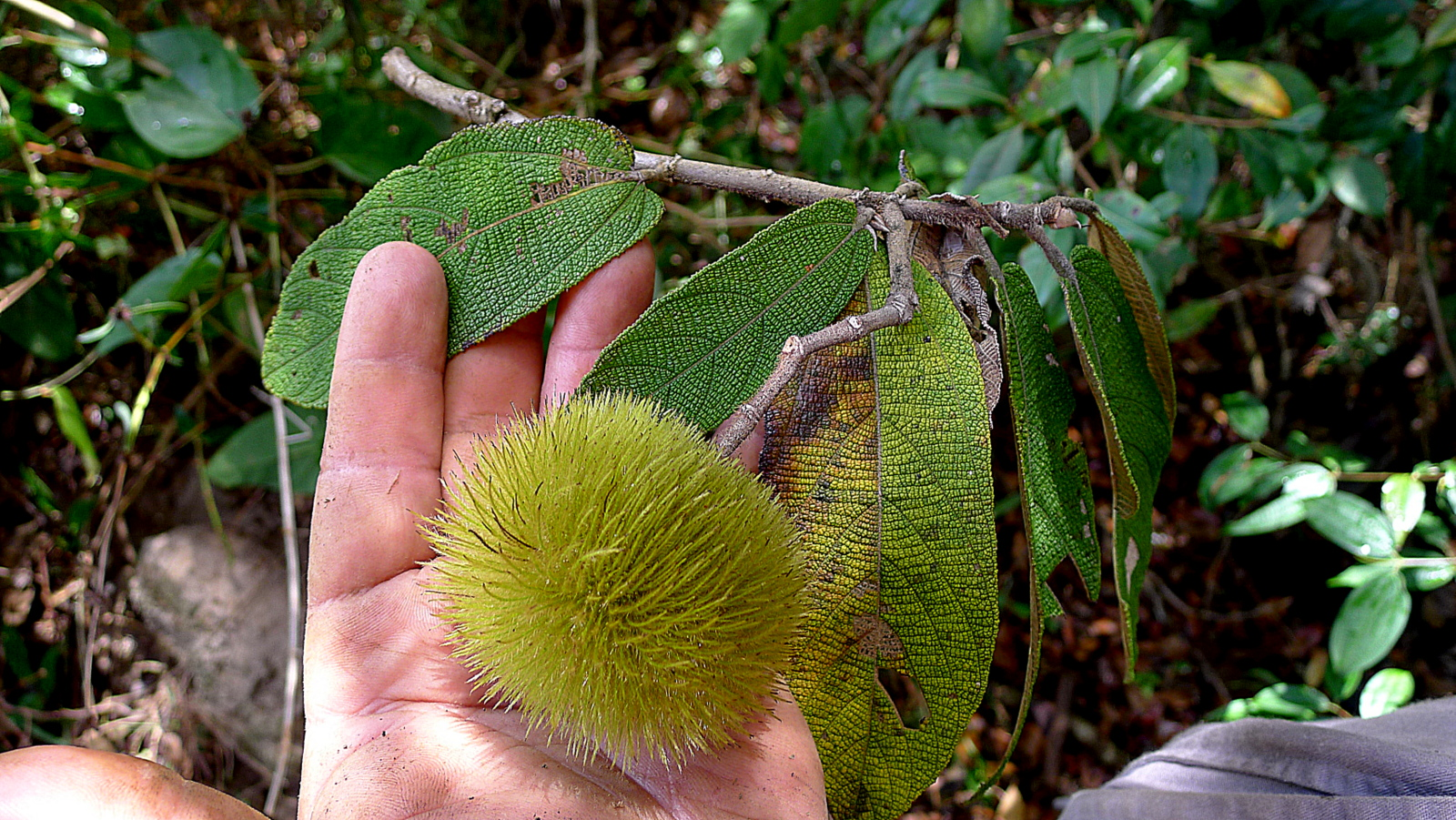

Conservation status
- Least Concern (IUCN 3.1)

Scientific classification
- Kingdom: Plantae
- Clade: Embryophytes
- Clade: Tracheophytes
- Clade: Angiosperms
- Clade: Eudicots
- Clade: Rosids
- Order: Malvales
- Family: Malvaceae
- Genus: Apeiba
- Species: A. albiflora

Binomial name
- Apeiba albiflora Ducke

= Apeiba albiflora =

Species of tree

Apeiba albiflora is a tree which is often used as medicinal plant native to Amazon rainforest vegetation in Brazil, French Guiana, Guyana, and Suriname.
