= Stigmaphyllon timoriense =

- Fruit and foliage

Conservation status
- Least Concern (NCA)

Scientific classification
- Kingdom: Plantae
- Clade: Tracheophytes
- Clade: Angiosperms
- Clade: Eudicots
- Clade: Rosids
- Order: Malpighiales
- Family: Malpighiaceae
- Genus: Stigmaphyllon
- Species: S. timoriense

Binomial name
- Stigmaphyllon timoriense C.E.Anderson

Synonyms
- Banisteria timoriensis DC.; Ryssopterys timoriensis (DC.) Blume ex A.Juss.; Hiraea obscura Blume; Hiraea ovata Blume; Ryssopterys timoriensis f. amboinensis Nied.

Species of flowering plant

Stigmaphyllon timoriense is a species of plant in the family Malpighiaceae, native to parts of Southeast Asia, Australia and the western Pacific. It is a woody vine that grows in rainforest, beach forest, and vine thickets, up to 400 m (1,300 ft) above sea level. In Queensland it has the conservation status of least concern.
