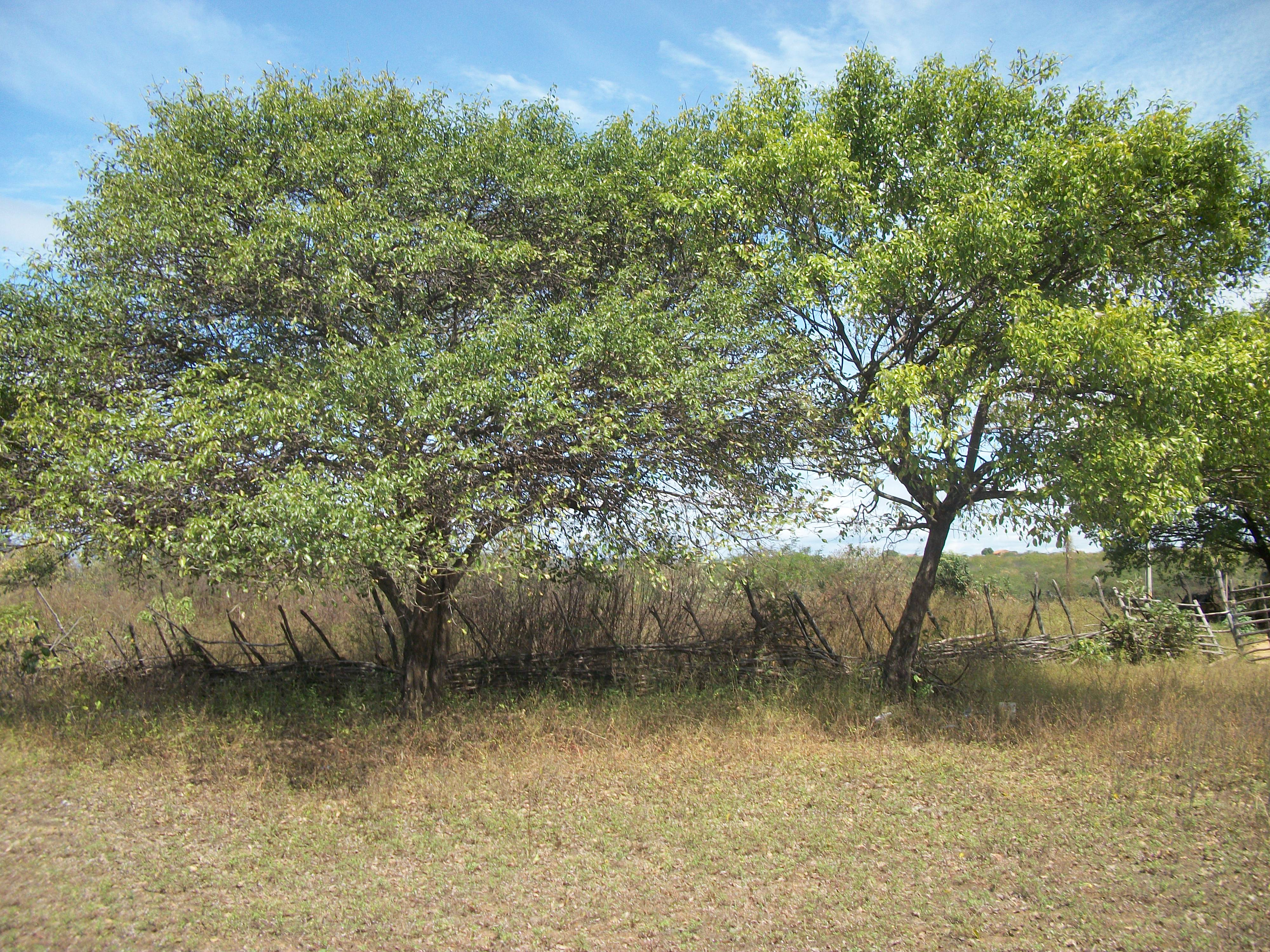

Scientific classification
- Kingdom: Plantae
- Clade: Tracheophytes
- Clade: Angiosperms
- Clade: Eudicots
- Clade: Asterids
- Order: Gentianales
- Family: Apocynaceae
- Genus: Aspidosperma
- Species: A. pyrifolium

Binomial name
- Aspidosperma pyrifolium Mart.

Synonyms
- Aspidosperma guaraniticum Malme; Aspidosperma martii Silva Manso; Aspidosperma molle Mart.; Aspidosperma populifolium A.DC.; Aspidosperma pyrifolium var. molle (Mart.) Müll.Arg.; Aspidosperma refractum Mart.; Macaglia martii (Silva Manso) Kuntze; Macaglia populifolia (A.DC.) Kuntze; Macaglia pyrifolia (Mart.) Kuntze; Macaglia refracta (Mart.) Kuntze

= Aspidosperma pyrifolium =

Species of tree

Aspidosperma pyrifolium, synonym Aspidosperma populifolium, is a tree native to Brazil and Paraguay, which is typical of Caatinga vegetation. In addition, it is useful for beekeeping. It was first described by Carl Friedrich Philipp von Martius in 1824.

== See also ==
- List of honey plants
- List of plants of Caatinga vegetation of Brazil
