= Stigmaphyllon nudiflorum =

Conservation status
- Critically Endangered (IUCN 3.1)

Scientific classification
- Kingdom: Plantae
- Clade: Tracheophytes
- Clade: Angiosperms
- Clade: Eudicots
- Clade: Rosids
- Order: Malpighiales
- Family: Malpighiaceae
- Genus: Stigmaphyllon
- Species: S. nudiflorum

Binomial name
- Stigmaphyllon nudiflorum Diels

Species of flowering plant

Stigmaphyllon nudiflorum is a species of plant in the Malpighiaceae family. It is endemic to Ecuador. Its natural habitat is subtropical or tropical dry forests.
