= Stryphnodendron harbesonii =

Conservation status
- Vulnerable (IUCN 2.3)

Scientific classification
- Kingdom: Plantae
- Clade: Tracheophytes
- Clade: Angiosperms
- Clade: Eudicots
- Clade: Rosids
- Order: Fabales
- Family: Fabaceae
- Subfamily: Caesalpinioideae
- Clade: Mimosoid clade
- Genus: Stryphnodendron
- Species: S. harbesonii

Binomial name
- Stryphnodendron harbesonii Elm.

Species of legume

Stryphnodendron harbesonii is a species of flowering plant in the family Fabaceae. It occurs in areas of lowland forest up to 150 m. It is found only in the Philippines. It is threatened by habitat loss.
