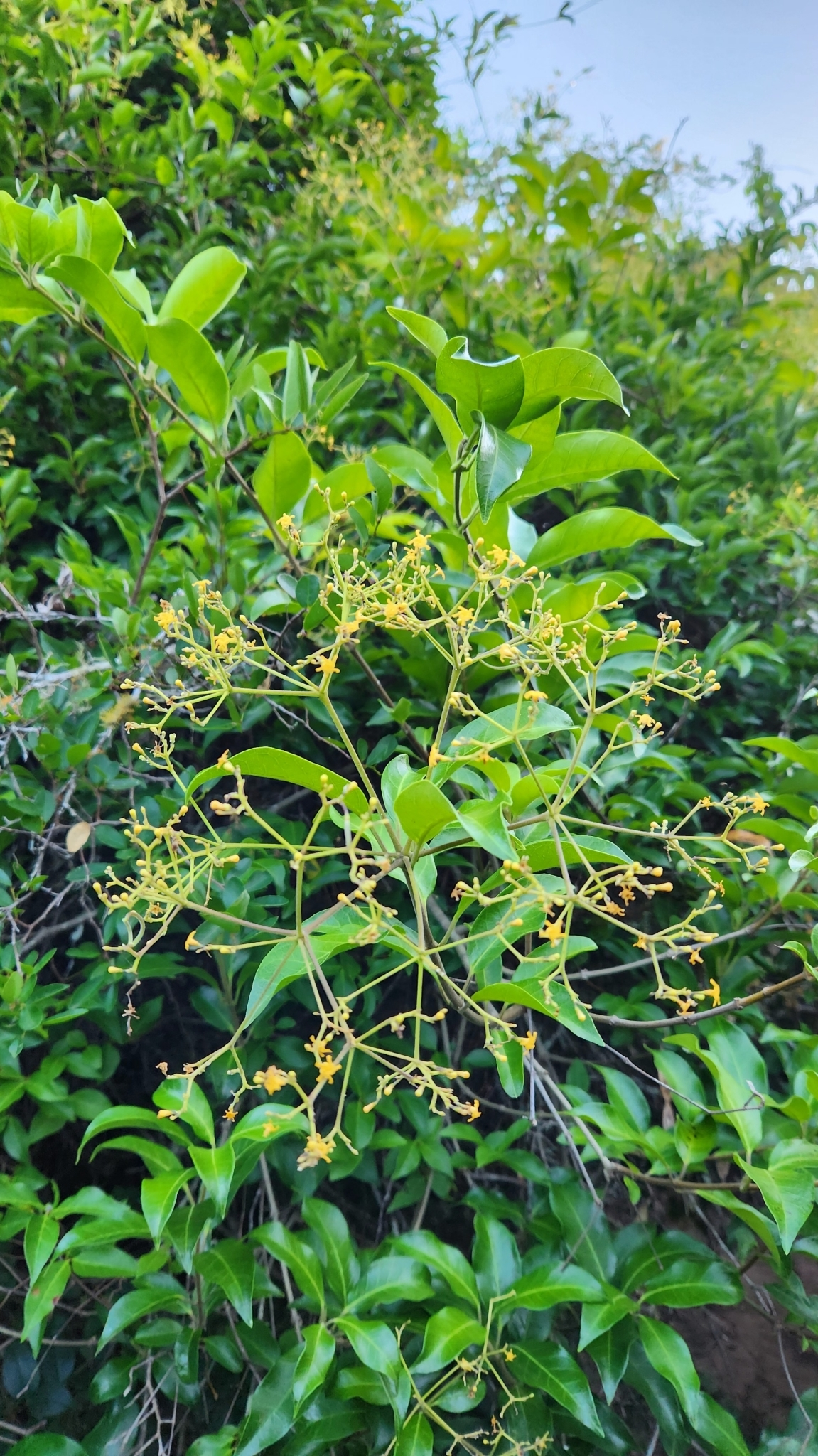
- Condylocarpon isthmicum in Uruguay

Scientific classification
- Kingdom: Plantae
- Clade: Embryophytes
- Clade: Tracheophytes
- Clade: Spermatophytes
- Clade: Angiosperms
- Clade: Eudicots
- Clade: Asterids
- Order: Gentianales
- Family: Apocynaceae
- Subfamily: Rauvolfioideae
- Tribe: Alyxieae
- Subtribe: Condylocarpinae
- Genus: Condylocarpon; Desf.

Synonyms
- Hortsmania Miq.; Maycockia A.DC.; Rhipidia Markgr.

= Condylocarpon =

Genus of plants

Condylocarpon is a genus of flowering plants in the family Apocynaceae first described as a genus in 1822. It is primarily native to South America, though found also in Trinidad and Tobago and Nicaragua.

Species

- Condylocarpon amazonicum (Markgr.) Ducke - Suriname, Venezuela, Bolivia, NW Brazil
- †Condylocarpon glabrum Müll.Arg. - Espírito Santo in Brazil but extinct
- Condylocarpon guyanense Desf. - French Guiana, Guyana, Amapá
- Condylocarpon intermedium Müll.Arg. - Nicaragua, Trinidad & Tobago, Venezuela, the Guianas, N Brazil
- Condylocarpon isthmicum (Vell.) A.DC. - Brazil, Paraguay, Uruguay, NE Argentina
- Condylocarpon myrtifolium (Miq.) Müll.Arg. - Venezuela, Bolivia, NW Brazil, the Guianas
- Condylocarpon pubiflorum Müll.Arg. - Venezuela, Colombia, Peru, NW Brazil
