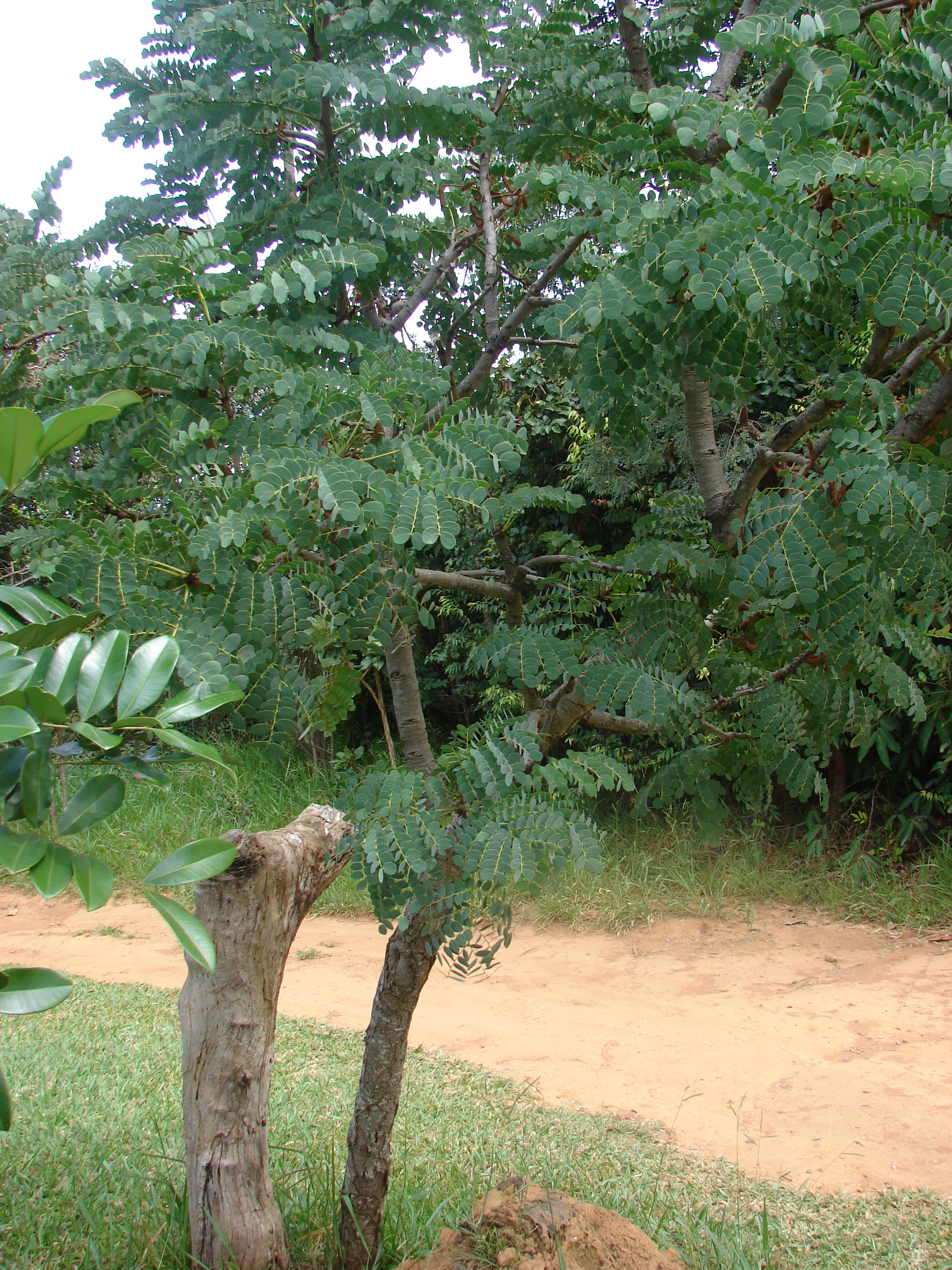
- Stryphnodendron adstringens

Scientific classification
- Kingdom: Plantae
- Clade: Tracheophytes
- Clade: Angiosperms
- Clade: Eudicots
- Clade: Rosids
- Order: Fabales
- Family: Fabaceae
- Subfamily: Caesalpinioideae
- Clade: Mimosoid clade
- Genus: Stryphnodendron; Mart. (1837)

Species
- 28; see text

Synonyms
- Folianthera Raf. (1838)

= Stryphnodendron =

Genus of legumes

Stryphnodendron is a genus of flowering plant in the legume family, Fabaceae. It includes 28 species of trees and suffrutices native to the tropical Americas, ranging from Nicaragua to Bolivia, Paraguay, and southern Brazil. Typical habitats include tropical rain forest and riparian forest, seasonally dry forest, cerrado (open woodland and savanna), and caatinga (thorn scrub). It belongs to the mimosoid clade of the subfamily Caesalpinioideae.

== Species ==
Stryphnodendron comprises the following species:

- Stryphnodendron adstringens (Mart.) Coville
- Stryphnodendron barbatulum Rizzini & Heringer
- Stryphnodendron confertum Heringer & Rizzini
- Stryphnodendron conicum Scalon
- Stryphnodendron cristalinae Heringer
- Stryphnodendron dryaticum Scalon
- Stryphnodendron excelsum Harms
- Stryphnodendron flammatum Kleinhoonte
- Stryphnodendron flavotomentosum A.G.Lima & V.C.Souza
- Stryphnodendron foreroi E.M.O.Martins
- Stryphnodendron glandulosum (Forero) Scalon
- Stryphnodendron guianense (Aubl.) Benth.
- Stryphnodendron harbesonii (not accepted)
- Stryphnodendron heringeri Occhioni f.
- Stryphnodendron holosericeum Scalon
- Stryphnodendron levelii R.S.Cowan
- Stryphnodendron microstachyum Poepp.
- Stryphnodendron orinocense Scalon
- Stryphnodendron platycarpum Scalon
- Stryphnodendron platyspicum Rizzini & Heringer
- Stryphnodendron polyphyllum Mart.
- Stryphnodendron porcatum D.A.Neill & Occhioni f.
- Stryphnodendron pulcherrimum (Willd.) Hochr.
- Stryphnodendron riparium Scalon
- Stryphnodendron roseiflorum (Ducke) Ducke
- Stryphnodendron rotundifolium Mart.
- Stryphnodendron velutinum Scalon
- Stryphnodendron venosum Scalon
