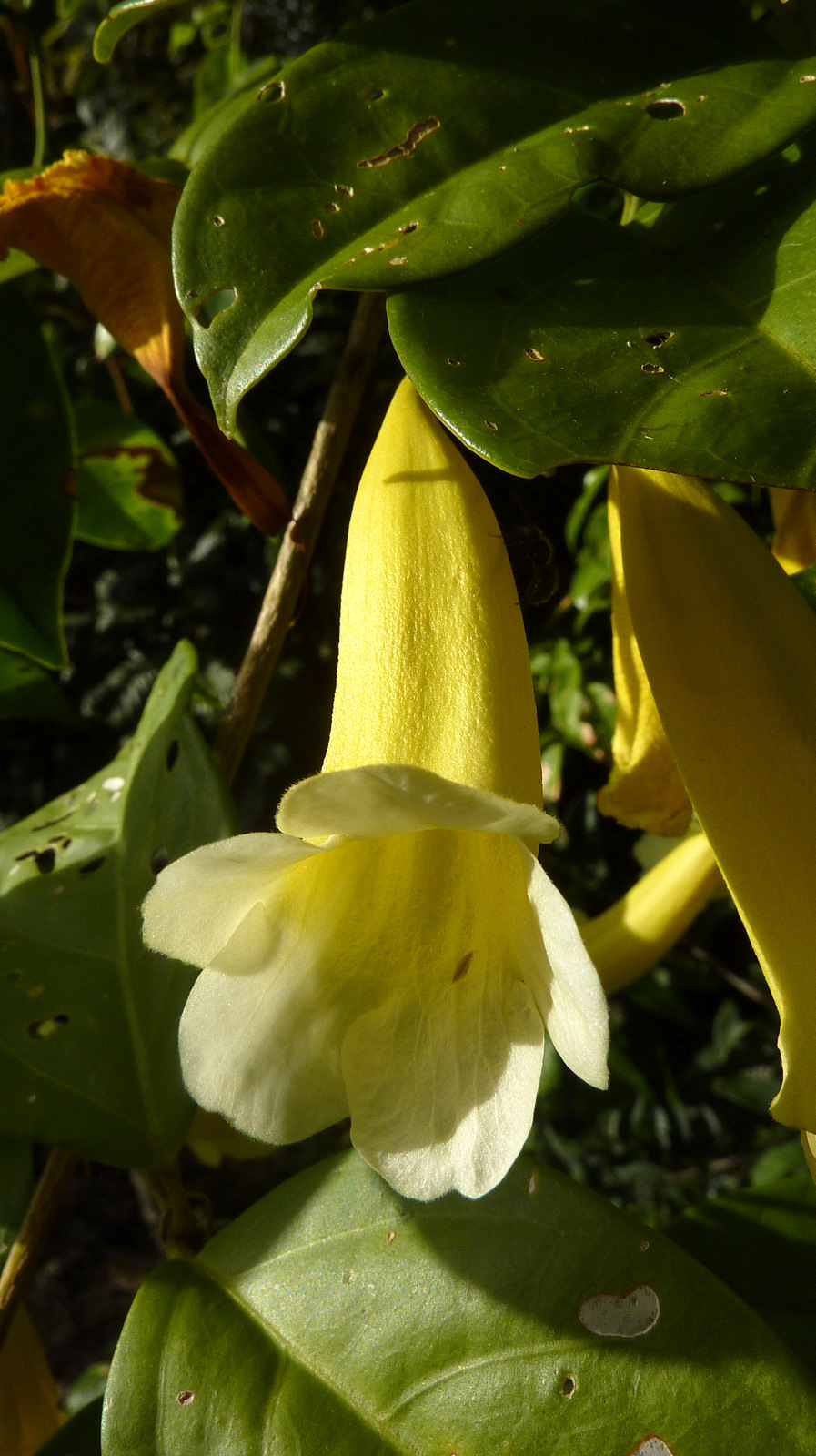
- Anemopaegma citrinum

Scientific classification
- Kingdom: Plantae
- Clade: Tracheophytes
- Clade: Angiosperms
- Clade: Eudicots
- Clade: Asterids
- Order: Lamiales
- Family: Bignoniaceae
- Tribe: Bignonieae
- Genus: Anemopaegma; Mart. ex Meisn.

Species
- See text

Synonyms
- Cupulissa Raf.; Platolaria Raf.; Pseudopaegma Urb.

= Anemopaegma =

Genus of flowering plants

Anemopaegma is a genus of flowering plants in the family Bignoniaceae. Species of Anemopaegma along with many other unrelated plants go by the name of catuaba.

== Species ==
Species include:

- Anemopaegma acutifolium DC.
- Anemopaegma alatum A.H.Gentry
- Anemopaegma album Mart. ex DC.
- Anemopaegma arvense (Vell.) Stellfeld ex De Souza
- Anemopaegma brevipes S.Moore
- Anemopaegma chamberlaynii (Sims) Bureau & K.Schum.
- Anemopaegma chrysanthum Dugand
- Anemopaegma chrysoleucum (Kunth) Sandwith
- Anemopaegma citrinum Mart. ex DC.
- Anemopaegma colombianum (Sandwith) A.H.Gentry
- Anemopaegma flavum Morong
- Anemopaegma floridum Mart. ex DC.
- Anemopaegma foetidum Bureau & K.Schum.
- Anemopaegma glaucum Mart. ex DC.
- Anemopaegma goyazense K.Schum.
- Anemopaegma gracile Bureau & K.Schum.
- Anemopaegma grandifolium (Jacq.) Merr. & Sandwith
- Anemopaegma granvillei A.H.Gentry
- Anemopaegma heringeri J.C.Gomes
- Anemopaegma hilarianum Bureau & K.Schum.
- Anemopaegma insculptum (Sandwith) A.H.Gentry
- Anemopaegma ionanthum A.H.Gentry
- Anemopaegma jucundum Bureau & K.Schum.
- Anemopaegma karstenii Bureau & K.Schum.
- Anemopaegma laeve DC.
- Anemopaegma longidens Mart. ex DC.
- Anemopaegma longipetiolatum Sprague
- Anemopaegma mirabile (Sandwith) A.H.Gentry
- Anemopaegma oligoneuron (Sprague & Sandwith) A.H.Gentry
- Anemopaegma orbiculatum (Jacq.) DC.
- Anemopaegma pabstii A.H.Gentry
- Anemopaegma pachyphyllum Bureau & K.Schum.
- Anemopaegma paraense Bureau & K.Schum.
- Anemopaegma parkeri Sprague
- Anemopaegma patelliforme A.H.Gentry
- Anemopaegma prostratum DC.
- Anemopaegma puberulum (Seibert) Miranda
- Anemopaegma robustum Bureau & K.Schum.
- Anemopaegma rugosum (Schltdl.) Sprague
- Anemopaegma salicifolium (Kunth) Sandwith
- Anemopaegma santaritense A.H.Gentry
- Anemopaegma scabriusculum Mart. ex DC.
- Anemopaegma setilobum A.H.Gentry
- Anemopaegma velutinum Mart. ex DC.
- Anemopaegma villosum A.H.Gentry
