= Polygonum acre =

Polygonum acre is a botanical synonym of three species of plant:

- Persicaria decipiens, synonym published in 1832 by Carl Meissner
- Persicaria hydropiper, synonym published in 1779 by Jean-Baptiste Lamarck
- Persicaria punctata, synonym published in 1817 by Carl Sigismund Kunth
