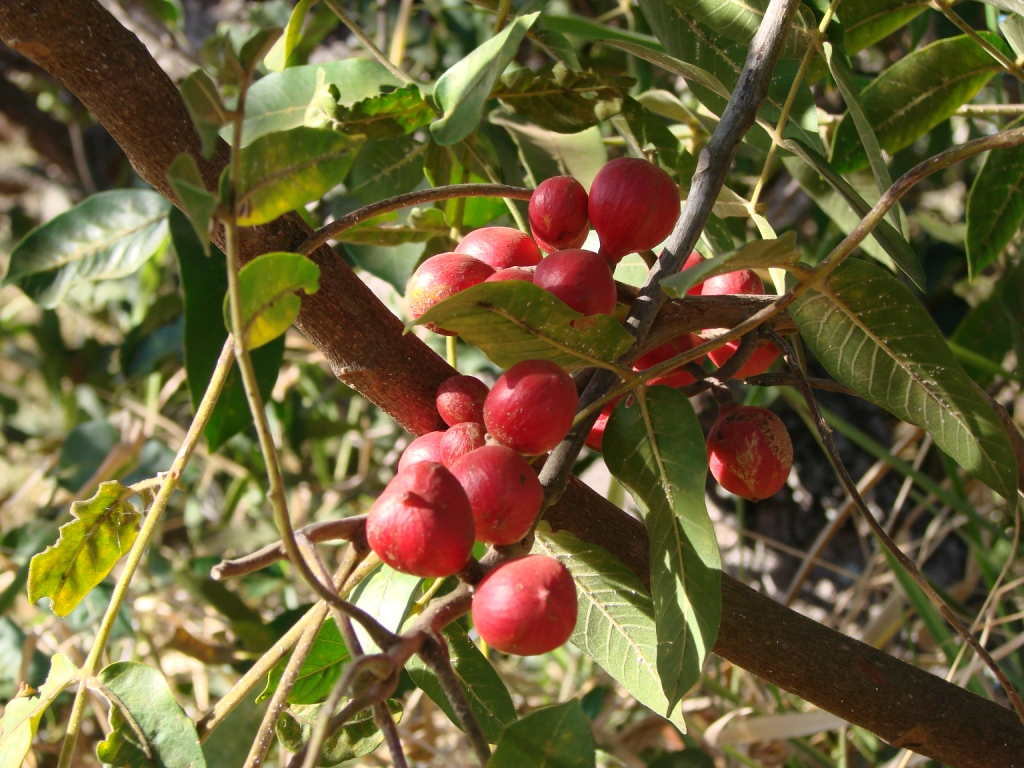
- Leaves and fruits

Conservation status
- Least Concern (IUCN 3.1)

Scientific classification
- Kingdom: Plantae
- Clade: Tracheophytes
- Clade: Angiosperms
- Clade: Eudicots
- Clade: Rosids
- Order: Sapindales
- Family: Meliaceae
- Subfamily: Melioideae
- Genus: Cabralea; A. Juss.
- Species: C. canjerana

Binomial name
- Cabralea canjerana (Vell.) Mart.

Synonyms
- List: subsp. canjerana: Cabralea brachystachya C.DC.; Cabralea burchellii C.DC.; Cabralea cauliflora Harms; Cabralea corcovadensis C.DC.; Cabralea eichleriana C.DC.; Cabralea eichleriana var. macrantha C.DC.; Cabralea erismatica A.C.Sm.; Cabralea estrellensis C.DC.; Cabralea gaudichaudii C.DC.; Cabralea glaberrima A.Juss.; Cabralea glaziovii C.DC.; Cabralea jussiaeana C.DC.; Cabralea lacaziana Rizzini; Cabralea laevis C.DC.; Cabralea lagoensis C.DC.; Cabralea lagoensis var. glabra C.DC.; Cabralea lundii C.DC.; Cabralea macrantha (C.DC.) Harms; Cabralea macrophylla C.DC.; Cabralea macrophylla var. decomposita C.DC.; Cabralea multijuga C.DC.; Cabralea oblongifoliola C.DC.; Cabralea pallescens C.DC.; Cabralea pedunculata C.DC.; Cabralea pilosa C.DC.; Cabralea pilosa var. glabrior C.DC.; Cabralea poeppigii C.DC.; Cabralea riedelii C.DC.; Cabralea rojasii C.DC.; Cabralea schwackei C.DC.; Cabralea silvatica C.DC.; Cabralea sulcata C.DC.; Cabralea villosa C.DC.; Cabralea warmingiana C.DC.; Cabralea warmingiana var. coriacea C.DC.; Trichilia canjerana Vell. subsp. polytricha: Cabralea affinis A.Juss.; Cabralea inaequilatera Casar.; Cabralea microcalyx Harms; Cabralea oblongiflora C.DC.; Cabralea oligotricha A.Juss.; Cabralea polytricha A.Juss.; Cabralea polytricha var. affinis C.DC.; Cabralea polytricha var. brevipaniculata C.DC.; Cabralea polytricha var. goyazana C.DC.; Cabralea polytricha var. grandiflora C.DC.; Cabralea polytricha var. macrophylla C.DC.; Cabralea polytricha var. multifida C.DC.; Cabralea polytricha var. oligotricha C.DC.; Cabralea polytricha var. pallida C.DC.; Cabralea polytricha var. subepunctata C.DC.; Cabralea rubiginosa C.DC.; Cabralea tomentosa Casar. subsp. selloi: Cabralea clausseniana C.DC.; Cabralea coriacea C.DC.; Cabralea floribunda Harms; Cabralea humilis C.DC.; Cabralea montana C.DC.; Cabralea selloi C.DC.; Cabralea selloi var. parviflora C.DC.

= Cabralea =

Genus of trees

Cabralea is a genus of trees in the family Meliaceae. It has one species, Cabralea canjerana. It is dioecious, with male and female flowers on separate plants.

== Taxonomy ==
Cabralea canjerana currently has 3 accepted subspecies:

- subsp. canjerana – Costa Rica to Brazil and NE Argentina
- subsp. polytricha (A.Juss.) T.D.Penn. – Brazil
- subsp. selloi (C.DC.) Barreiros – Brazil
