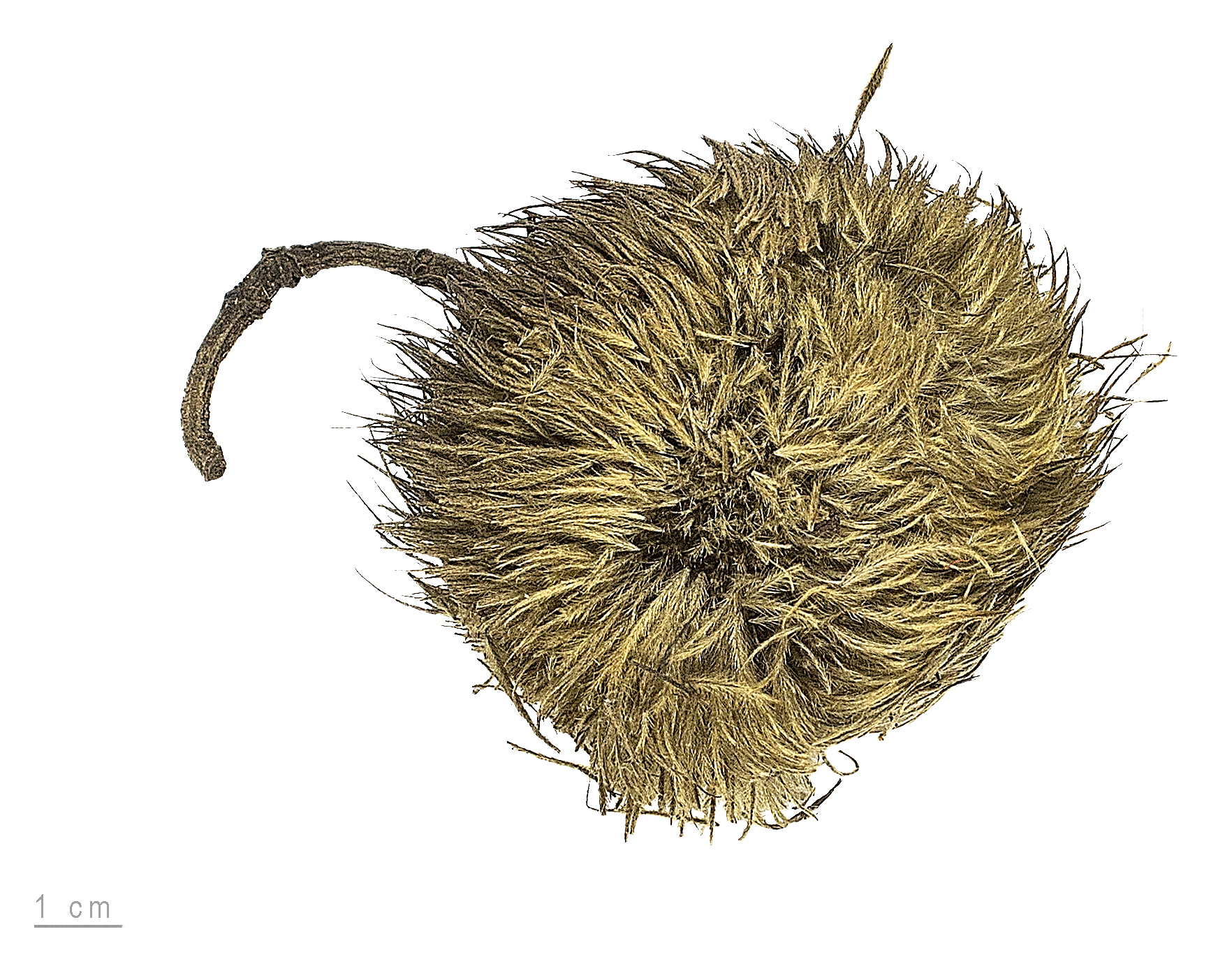
- Fruit of Apeiba tibourbou

Conservation status
- Least Concern (IUCN 3.1)

Scientific classification
- Kingdom: Plantae
- Clade: Tracheophytes
- Clade: Angiosperms
- Clade: Eudicots
- Clade: Rosids
- Order: Malvales
- Family: Malvaceae
- Genus: Apeiba
- Species: A. tibourbou

Binomial name
- Apeiba tibourbou Aubl.

= Apeiba tibourbou =

Species of tree

Apeiba tibourbou is a tree native to Caatinga and Cerrado vegetation in Brazil, and Costa Rica. It is used as an alternative fiber crop to make paper. It is found in Mexico, Central America, and the northern part of South America.

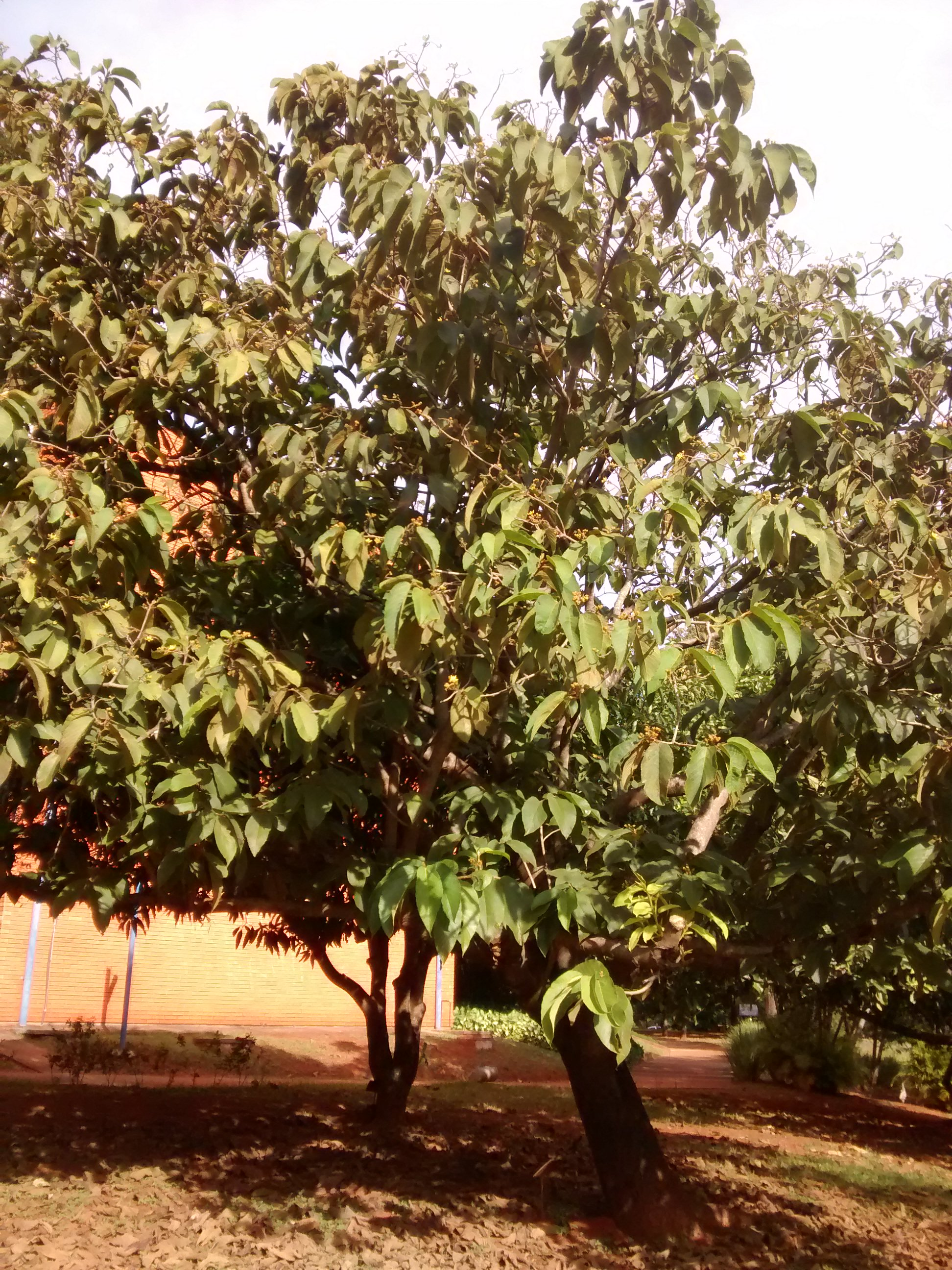
The tree of Apeiba tibourbou.

This fast-growing tree typically reaches 15 meters tall, though it can reach 25 meters in some habitats. The star-shaped yellow flowers give way to dry capsules covered with soft green spines. The leaves are pointed at the tip and rounded at the base, 10–30 centimeters long and 6–12 centimeters wide, borne on petioles 1–3 centimeters long. The leaf margins are lightly serrated, and the veins are lightly hairy.

The wood is light and floats easily, so it is used to make buoys and small boats.
