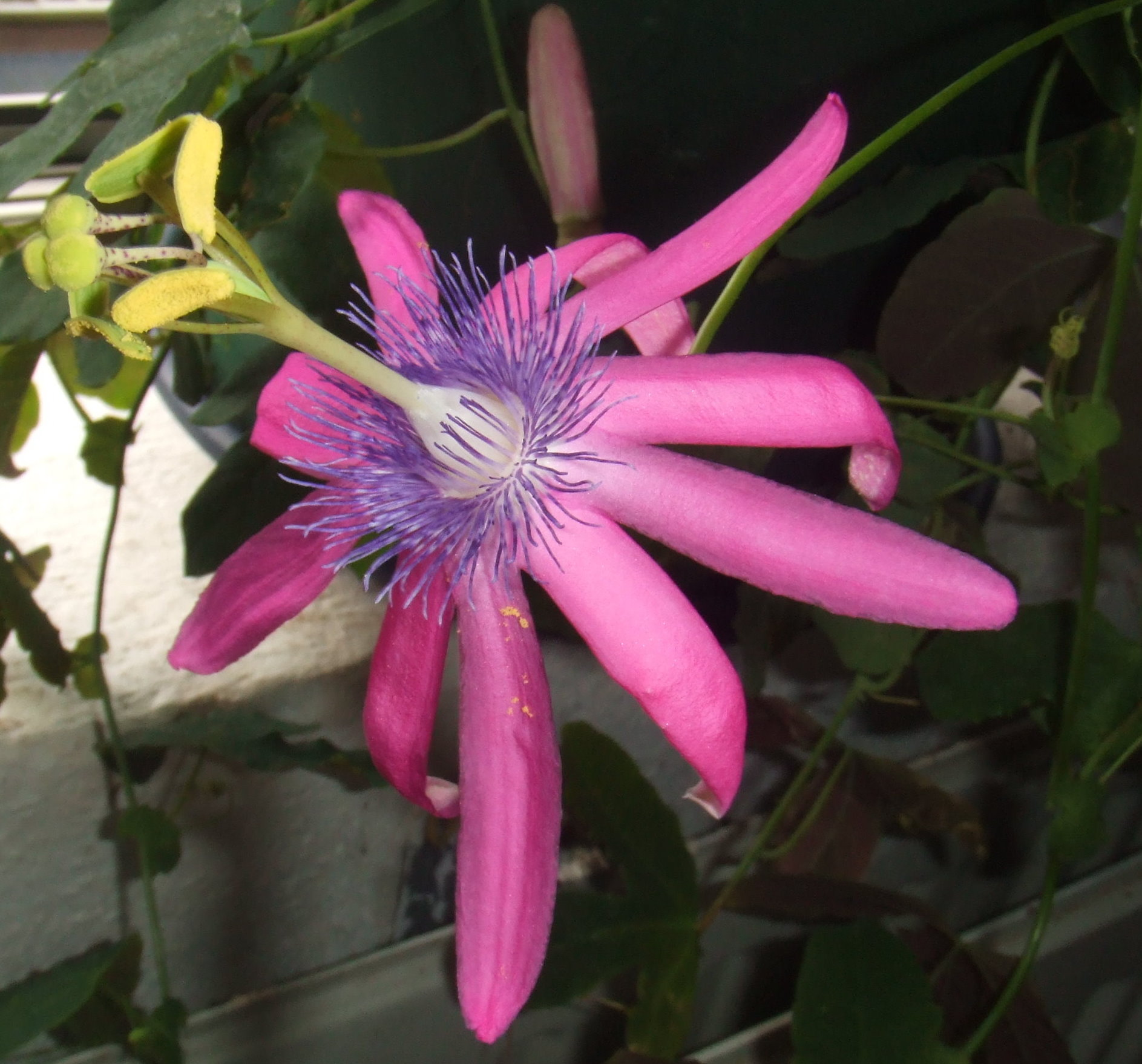

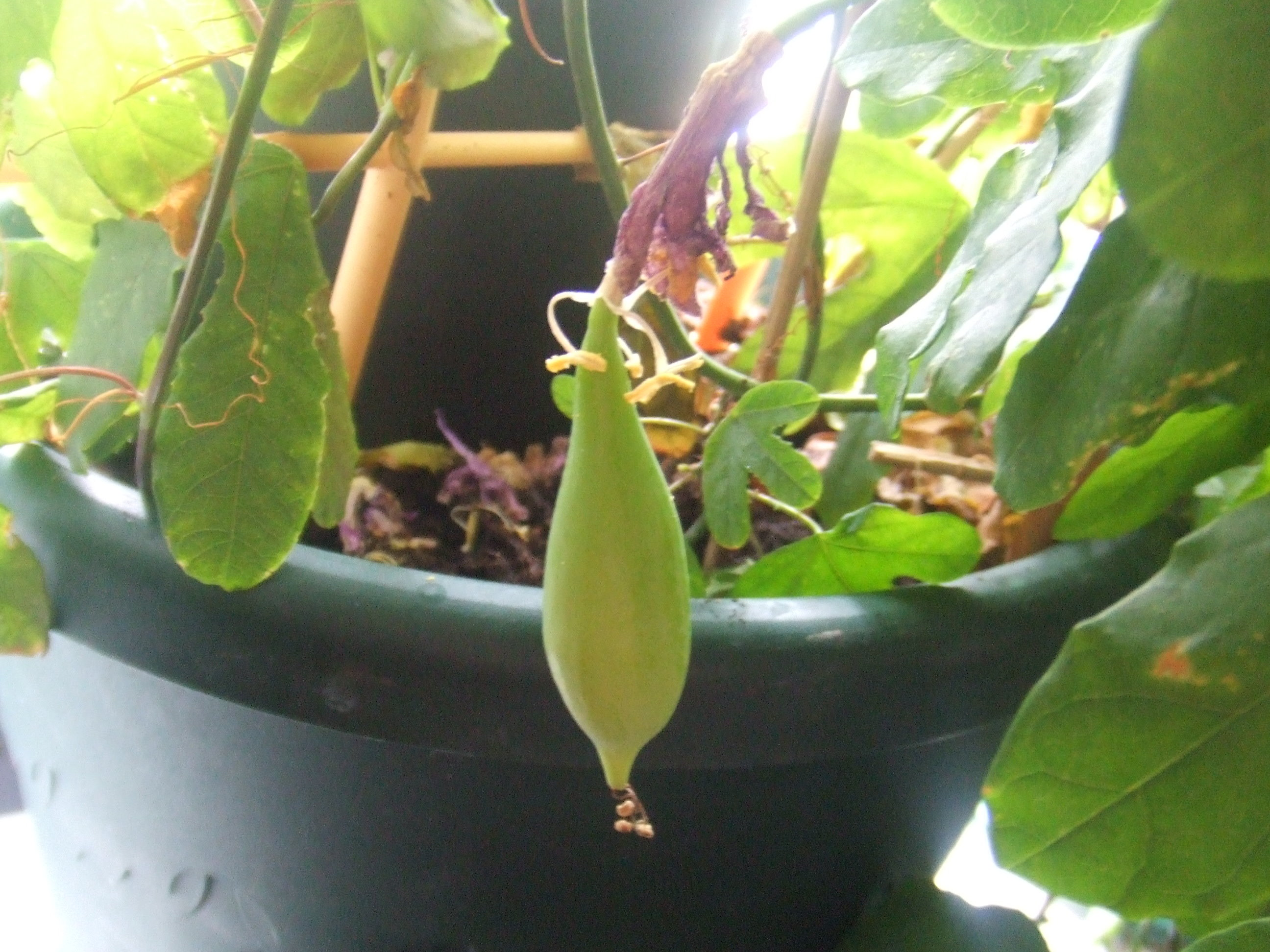

Scientific classification
- Kingdom: Plantae
- Clade: Tracheophytes
- Clade: Angiosperms
- Clade: Eudicots
- Clade: Rosids
- Order: Malpighiales
- Family: Passifloraceae
- Genus: Passiflora
- Species: P. kermesina

Binomial name
- Passiflora kermesina Link & Otto

Synonyms
- Passiflora raddiana DC.

= Passiflora kermesina =

Species of vine

Passiflora kermesina ('kermesina'=crimson) (syn. Passiflora raddiana DC.) is a native plant of Brazil, which is found in the wild in Caatinga and Cerrado vegetation.

It is cultivated as a vining ornamental plant.
