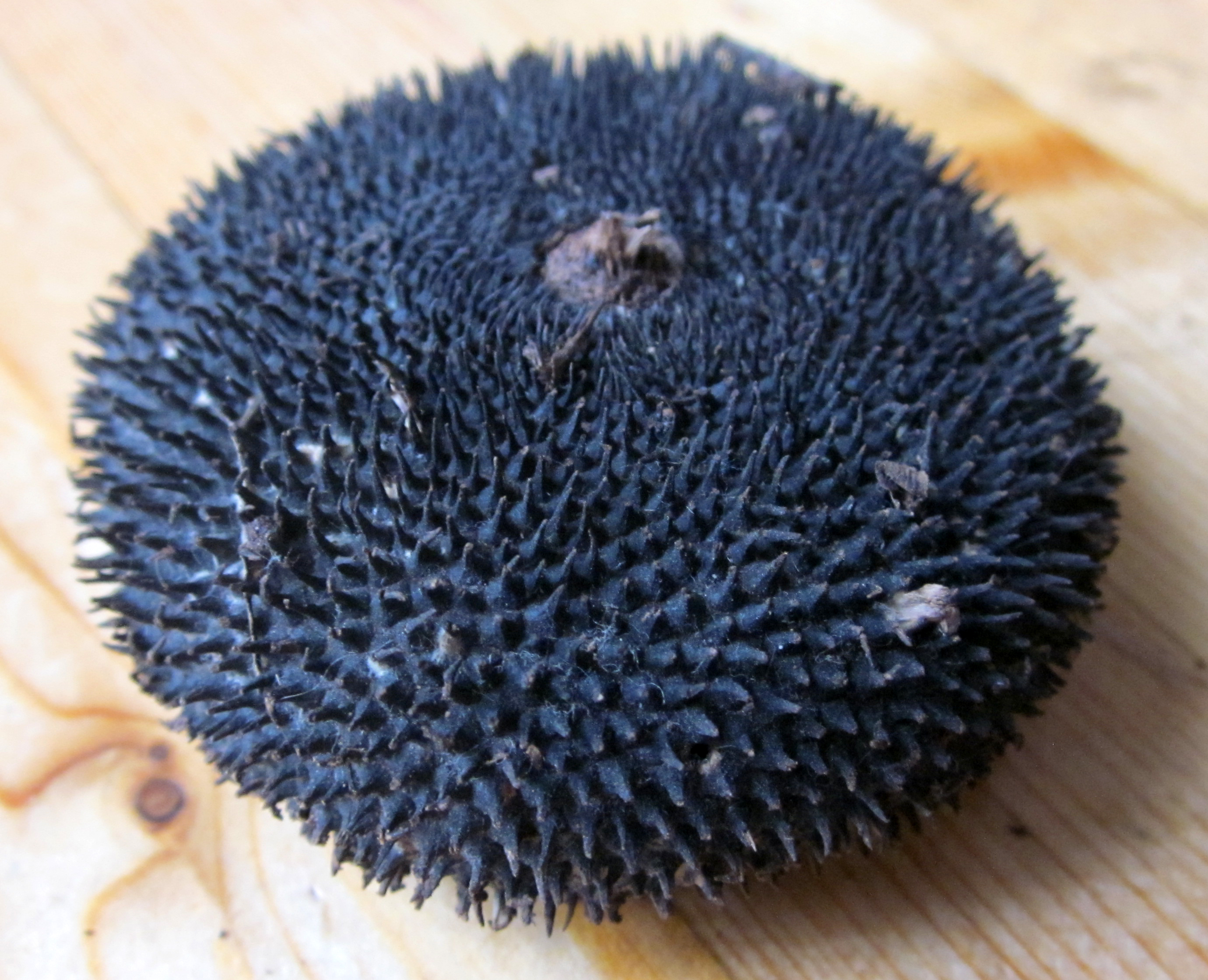
- Fruit of Apeiba echinata

Scientific classification
- Kingdom: Plantae
- Clade: Tracheophytes
- Clade: Angiosperms
- Clade: Eudicots
- Clade: Rosids
- Order: Malvales
- Family: Malvaceae
- Subfamily: Grewioideae
- Genus: Apeiba; Aubl. (1775)

Species
- 10; see text

Synonyms
- Aubletia Schreb. (1789), nom. illeg.; Oxytandrum Neck. (1790), opus utique oppr.

= Apeiba =

Genus of flowering plants

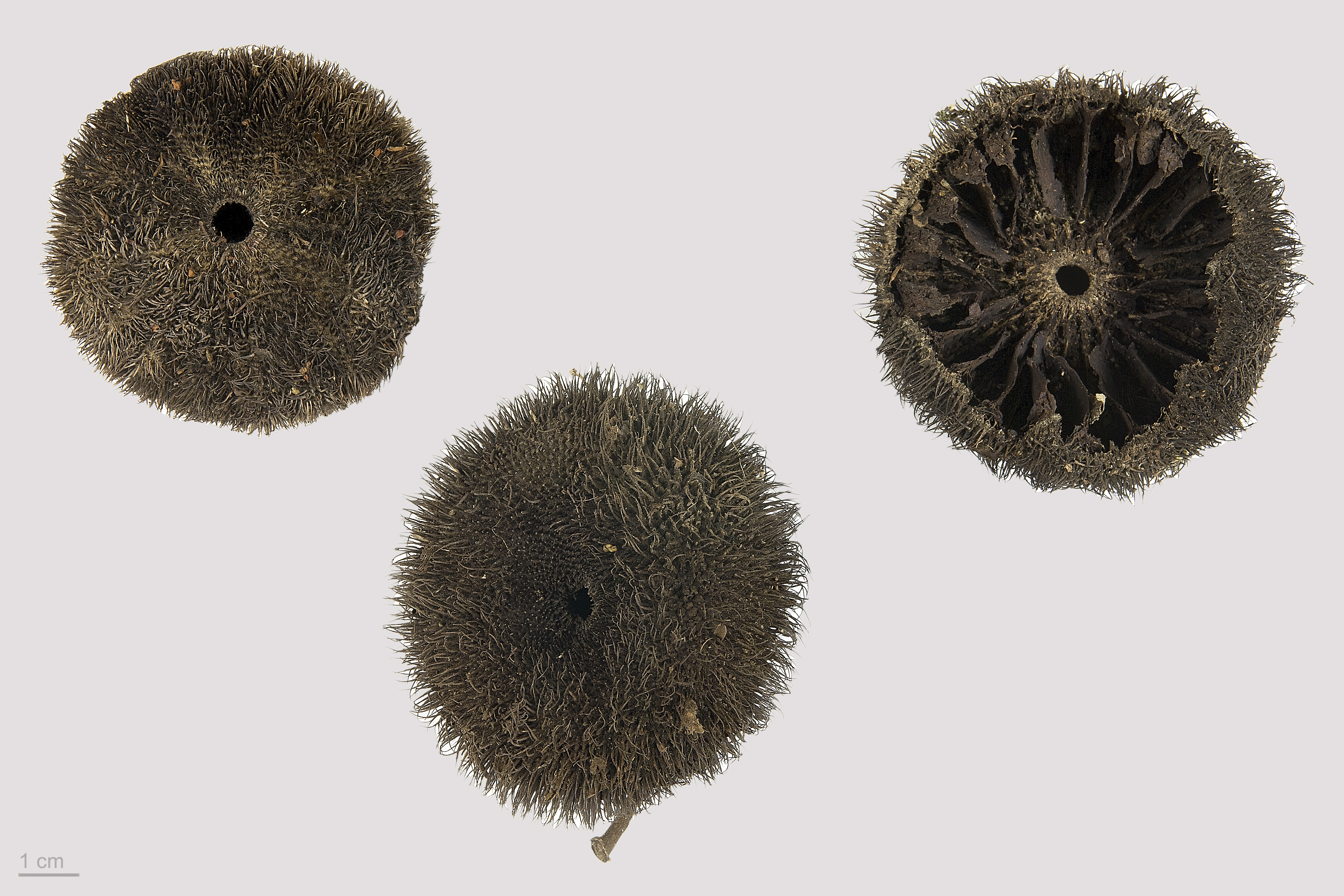
Apeiba glabra - MHNT

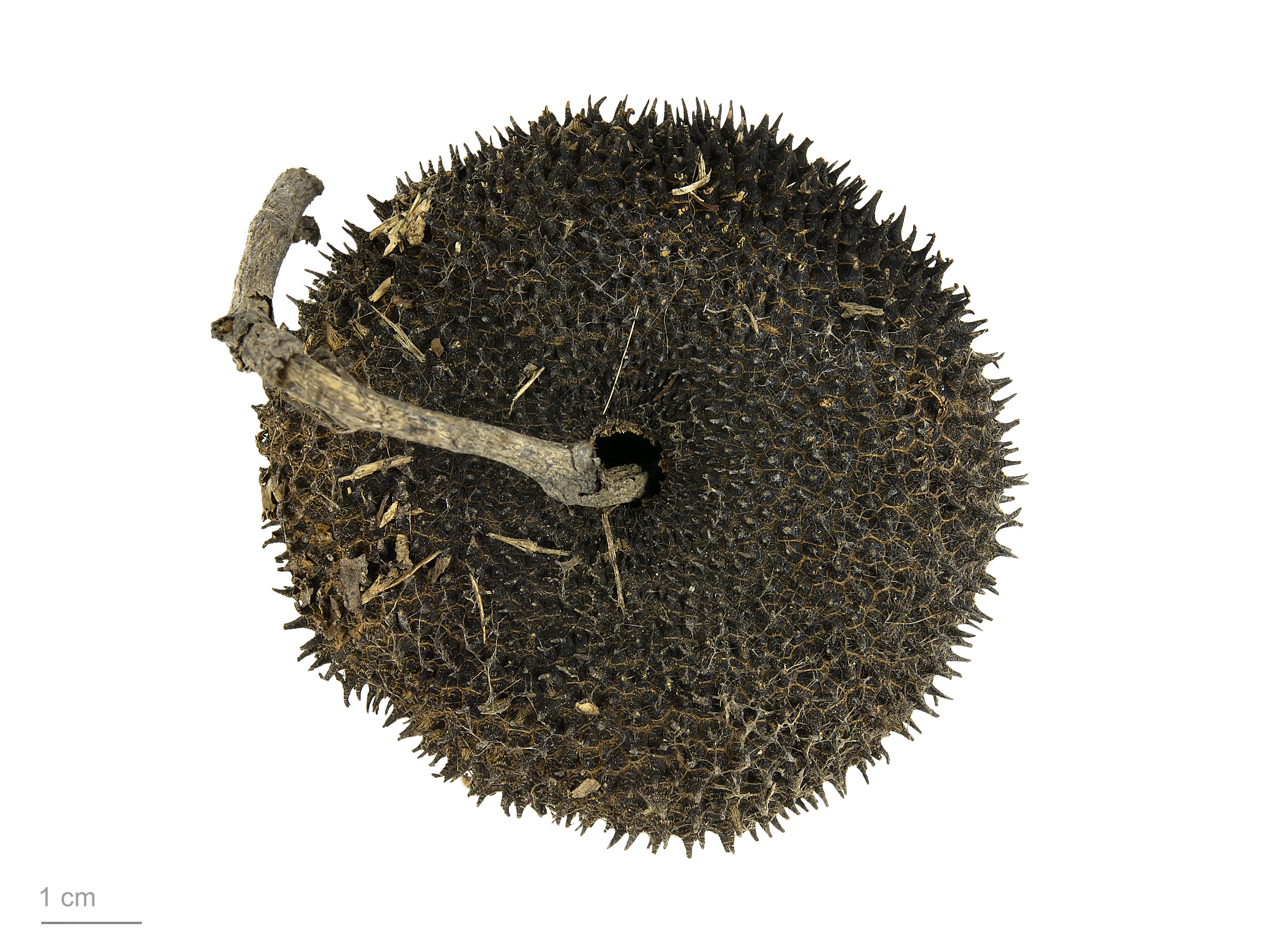
Apeiba petoumo - MHNT

Apeiba is a genus of shrubs or trees in the family Malvaceae. It includes ten species native to the tropical Americas, ranging from northeastern Mexico to Bolivia and southeastern Brazil.

== Species ==
Ten species are accepted.

- Apeiba albiflora Ducke
- Apeiba glabra Aubl.
- Apeiba intermedia Uittien
- Apeiba macropetala Ducke
- Apeiba membranacea Spruce ex Benth.
- Apeiba petoumo Aubl.
- Apeiba schomburgkii Szyszył.
- Apeiba tibourbou Aubl.
- Apeiba trombetensis Dorr
- Apeiba uittienii Jans.-Jac. & Westra
