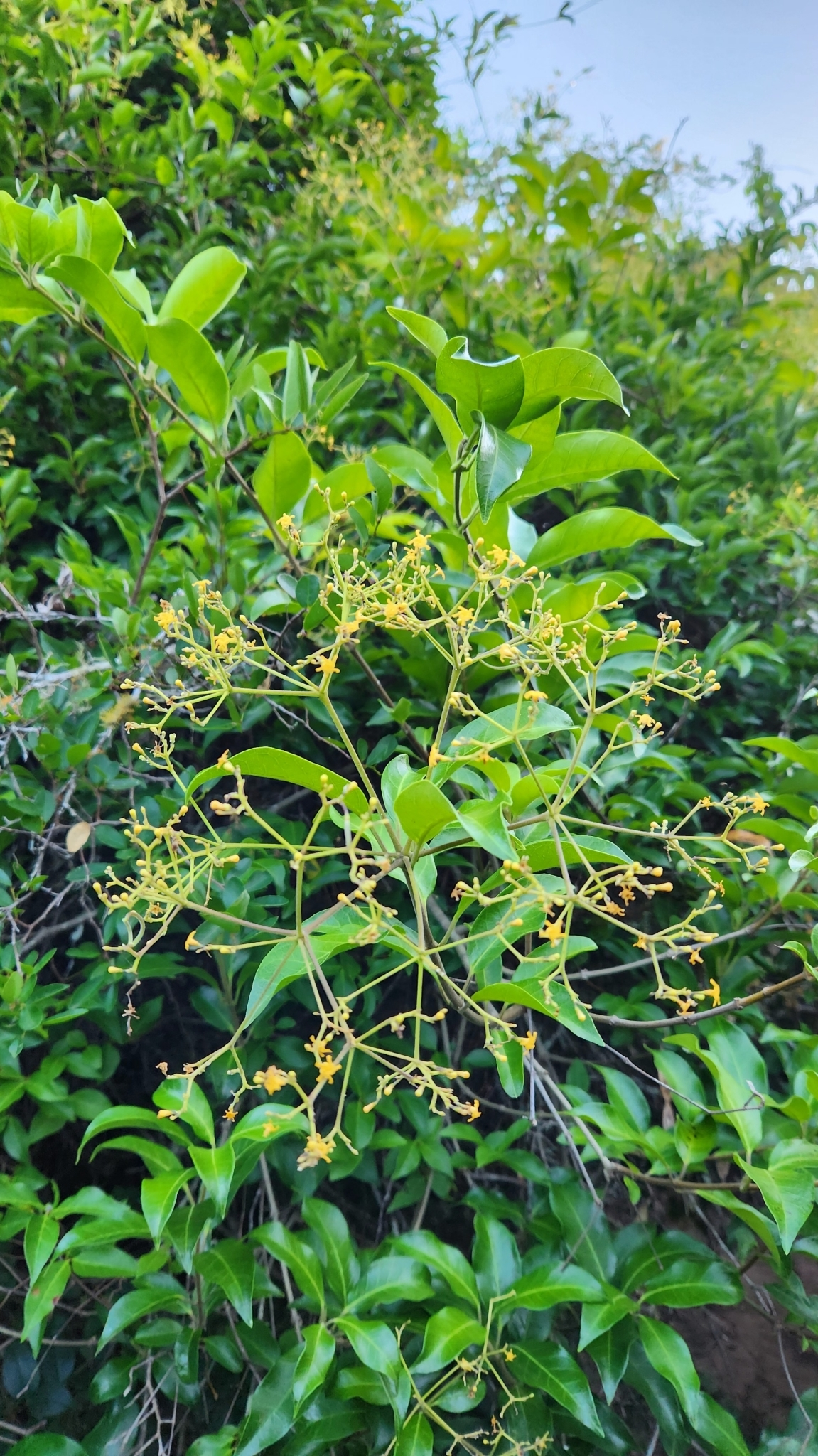
- In Uruguay

Scientific classification
- Kingdom: Plantae
- Clade: Embryophytes
- Clade: Tracheophytes
- Clade: Spermatophytes
- Clade: Angiosperms
- Clade: Eudicots
- Clade: Asterids
- Order: Gentianales
- Family: Apocynaceae
- Genus: Condylocarpon
- Species: C. isthmicum

Binomial name
- Condylocarpon isthmicum (Vell.) A.DC.

Synonyms
- Echites isthmicus Vell.; Condylocarpon brasiliense Mart. ex Müll.Arg.; Condylocarpon rauwolfiae (A.DC.) Müll.Arg.; Condylocarpon rauwolfiae var. acuminulatum Müll.Arg.; Condylocarpon rauwolfiae var. tomentosum Müll.Arg.; Maycockia rauwolfiae A.DC.

= Condylocarpon isthmicum =

Species of flowering plant

Condylocarpon isthmicum is a species of plant in the Apocynaceae family. It is native to Argentina, Brazil, Paraguay and Uruguay. José Mariano de Conceição Vellozo, the botanist who first formally described the species, named it after the narrow neck (Latinized forms of Greek ἰσθμός, isthmós) connecting the two sections of its fruit.

== Description ==
It is a large, woody, climbing plant. Its slender, cylindrical, tapering branches have lenticels. The young branches can be covered in soft hairs. Its leaves typically occur in groups of 3 per node. Its hairless, membranous to slightly leathery, elliptical to egg-shaped leaves are 7–11.5 by 2.5–4 centimeters. The tips of its leaves are pointed or tapering to a narrow point. The bases of the leaves are pointed to blunt. The leaves have 6–9 pairs of secondary veins emanating from their midribs. The midvein and secondary veins are sunken on the upper surfaces and raised on the undersides of the leaves. The tertiary veins on the underside of the leaves form a networked pattern. Its petioles are 0.9–1.5 centimeters long. The petioles are hairless to densely covered in soft hairs. Its branched, many-flowered Inflorescences occur in terminal positions. Its inflorescences are slightly to densely covered in soft hairs. The branches of the inflorescences have thin, colorless, egg-shaped to triangular bracts that are fringed with long hairs. Each flower is on a pedicels that is 1–4 millimeters long. The flower buds are globe-shaped. Its flowers have 5 sepals are fused at the base which has red-brown markings. The egg-shaped, thin, colorless, sepal lobes are hairless to densely covered in soft hairs and have margins that are fringed with long hairs. The 5 cream-colored to orange petals are fused at their base to form a 1.5–1.8 by 1–1.5 millimeter funnel-shaped tube topped with lobes. The petal lobes have strap-shaped appendages on their left margins that are 2–3 by 0.5–0.8 millimeters. The lower surface of the appendages have red-brown marks. Its egg-shaped to lance-shaped stamen are inserted half-way up the tube of the petals. Its ovaries have free carpels. Each carpels have 5–6 ovules arranged in two rows. Its stigma are orb-shaped. Its woody, hairless, pendent fruit are divided into two long, sections. Each section has several elliptical segments containing one seed. Each seed segment is 1.5–2.5 by 1–1.5 centimeters.

=== Reproductive biology ===
The pollen of Condylocarpon isthmicum is shed as permanent tetrads.

=== Distribution and habitat ===
It has been observed growing in secondary and gallery forests that sometimes flood.
