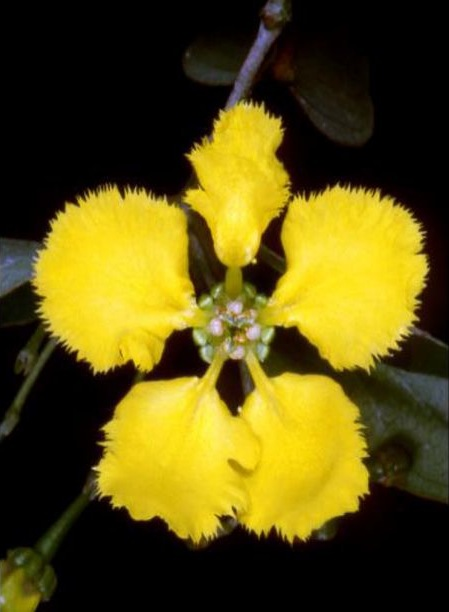
- Stigmaphyllon flower

Scientific classification
- Kingdom: Plantae
- Clade: Tracheophytes
- Clade: Angiosperms
- Clade: Eudicots
- Clade: Rosids
- Order: Malpighiales
- Family: Malpighiaceae
- Genus: Stigmaphyllon; A.Juss.

Species
- 119 species; see text

= Stigmaphyllon =

Genus of flowering plants

Stigmaphyllon is a genus of plants in the family Malpighiaceae, containing about 120 species. Its native range is western tropical Africa, tropical and subtropical Asia to the southwestern Pacific, and Mexico and tropical America. Amazonvine is a common name for species in this genus.

== Distribution ==
Stigmaphyllon subg. Stigmaphyllon comprises 92 species of mostly twining woody vines or rarely shrubs native to the Neotropics from southern Mexico to northern Argentina, except Chile and the high Andes; 13 species occur in the West Indies. One species (S. bannisterioides) is also found in seashore vegetation along the Atlantic Coast from southern Mexico to northern Brazil, in the West Indies, and along the coast of western Africa (Guinea Bissau, Guinea, Sierra Leone).

Stigmaphyllon subg. Ryssopterys includes 21 species of woody vines of the Sunda Islands (except Borneo and Sumatra), New Guinea, Queensland (Australia), New Caledonia, Vanuatu, the Solomon Islands, Micronesia, Palau, and the Philippines; S. timoriense has also been recorded from Taiwan and the Ryukyu Islands.

=== Threatened species ===
Three species from Ecuador, Stigmaphyllon ecuadorense (erroneously listed as Stigmaphyllon ecudorense), Stigmaphyllon eggersii, and Stigmaphyllon nudiflorum, are included in the 2006 IUCN Red List of Threatened Species.

== Species ==
The following 119 species are accepted by Plants of the World Online as of November 2026:

- Stigmaphyllon aberrans C.E.Anderson
- Stigmaphyllon abutilifolium (A.Juss.) C.E.Anderson
- Stigmaphyllon acuminatum A.Juss.
- Stigmaphyllon adenodon A.Juss.
- Stigmaphyllon adenophorum C.E.Anderson
- Stigmaphyllon affine A.Juss.
- Stigmaphyllon albidum (Blume) C.E.Anderson
- Stigmaphyllon alternans Triana & Planch.
- Stigmaphyllon alternifolium A.Juss.
- Stigmaphyllon angulosum (L.) A.Juss.
- Stigmaphyllon angustifolium (Nied.) C.E.Anderson
- Stigmaphyllon angustilobum A.Juss.
- Stigmaphyllon arenicola C.E.Anderson
- Stigmaphyllon argenteum C.E.Anderson
- Stigmaphyllon auriculatum (Cav.) A.Juss.
- Stigmaphyllon australiense (Nied.) C.E.Anderson
- Stigmaphyllon bannisterioides (L.) C.E.Anderson
- Stigmaphyllon blanchetii C.E.Anderson
- Stigmaphyllon bogotense Triana & Planch.
- Stigmaphyllon boliviense C.E.Anderson
- Stigmaphyllon bonariense (Hook. & Arn.) C.E.Anderson
- Stigmaphyllon bradei C.E.Anderson
- Stigmaphyllon brassii C.E.Anderson
- Stigmaphyllon caatingicola R.F.Almeida & Amorim
- Stigmaphyllon calcaratum N.E.Br.
- Stigmaphyllon carautae C.E.Anderson
- Stigmaphyllon cardiophyllum A.Juss.
- Stigmaphyllon cavernulosum C.E.Anderson
- Stigmaphyllon ciliatum (Lam.) A.Juss.
- Stigmaphyllon coccolobifolium Alain
- Stigmaphyllon coloratum Rusby
- Stigmaphyllon columbicum Nied.
- Stigmaphyllon cordatum Rose
- Stigmaphyllon crenatum C.E.Anderson
- Stigmaphyllon cuzcanum C.E.Anderson
- Stigmaphyllon dealbatum (A.Juss.) C.E.Anderson
- Stigmaphyllon dichotomum (L.) Griseb.
- Stigmaphyllon discolor (Gand.) C.E.Anderson
- Stigmaphyllon diversifolium (Kunth) A.Juss.
- Stigmaphyllon echitoides Triana & Planch.
- Stigmaphyllon ecuadorense C.E.Anderson
- Stigmaphyllon eggersii C.E.Anderson
- Stigmaphyllon ellipticum (Kunth) A.Juss.
- Stigmaphyllon emarginatum (Cav.) A.Juss.
- Stigmaphyllon finlayanum A.Juss.
- Stigmaphyllon floribundum (DC.) C.E.Anderson
- Stigmaphyllon florosum C.E.Anderson
- Stigmaphyllon gayanum A.Juss.
- Stigmaphyllon glabrum C.E.Anderson
- Stigmaphyllon goudotii C.E.Anderson
- Stigmaphyllon grandifolium (Guillaumin) C.E.Anderson
- Stigmaphyllon gymnopodum (Guillaumin) C.E.Anderson
- Stigmaphyllon harleyi W.R.Anderson
- Stigmaphyllon hatschbachii C.E.Anderson
- Stigmaphyllon herbaceum Cuatrec.
- Stigmaphyllon hispidum C.E.Anderson
- Stigmaphyllon hypargyreum Triana & Planch.
- Stigmaphyllon intermedium (Hochr.) C.E.Anderson
- Stigmaphyllon jatrophifolium A.Juss.
- Stigmaphyllon jobertii C.E.Anderson
- Stigmaphyllon laciniatum (Ekman ex Nied.) C.E.Anderson
- Stigmaphyllon lacunosum A.Juss.
- Stigmaphyllon lalandianum A.Juss.
- Stigmaphyllon lanceolatum C.E.Anderson
- Stigmaphyllon latifolium Benth.
- Stigmaphyllon lindenianum A.Juss.
- Stigmaphyllon macedoanum C.E.Anderson
- Stigmaphyllon mackeeanum C.E.Anderson
- Stigmaphyllon macropodum A.Juss.
- Stigmaphyllon mariae C.E.Anderson
- Stigmaphyllon matogrossense C.E.Anderson
- Stigmaphyllon maynense Huber
- Stigmaphyllon mcphersonii C.E.Anderson
- Stigmaphyllon merrillii C.E.Anderson
- Stigmaphyllon micranthum C.E.Anderson
- Stigmaphyllon microphyllum Griseb.
- Stigmaphyllon mikanifolium R.F.Almeida & Amorim
- Stigmaphyllon nipense Alain
- Stigmaphyllon nudiflorum Diels
- Stigmaphyllon occidentale R.F.Almeida
- Stigmaphyllon orientale Cuatrec.
- Stigmaphyllon palmatum (Cav.) A.Juss.
- Stigmaphyllon panamense C.E.Anderson
- Stigmaphyllon papuanum C.E.Anderson
- Stigmaphyllon paraense C.E.Anderson
- Stigmaphyllon paralias A.Juss.
- Stigmaphyllon patricianum-firmenichianum Butaud
- Stigmaphyllon peruvianum Nied.
- Stigmaphyllon pseudopuberum Nied.
- Stigmaphyllon puberulum Griseb.
- Stigmaphyllon puberum (Rich.) A.Juss.
- Stigmaphyllon pullenii C.E.Anderson
- Stigmaphyllon retusum Griseb. & Oerst.
- Stigmaphyllon romeroi Cuatrec.
- Stigmaphyllon rotundifolium A.Juss.
- Stigmaphyllon sagraeanum A.Juss.
- Stigmaphyllon salzmannii A.Juss.
- Stigmaphyllon sarmentosum Cuatrec.
- Stigmaphyllon saxicola C.E.Anderson
- Stigmaphyllon selerianum Nied.
- Stigmaphyllon singulare C.E.Anderson
- Stigmaphyllon sinuatum (DC.) A.Juss.
- Stigmaphyllon solomonense C.E.Anderson
- Stigmaphyllon stenophyllum C.E.Anderson
- Stigmaphyllon strigosum A.Juss.
- Stigmaphyllon stylopogon C.E.Anderson
- Stigmaphyllon suffruticosum Cuatrec.
- Stigmaphyllon sundaicum C.E.Anderson
- Stigmaphyllon taomense (Baker f.) C.E.Anderson
- Stigmaphyllon tarapotense C.E.Anderson
- Stigmaphyllon tergolanatum Cuatrec.
- Stigmaphyllon timoriense (DC.) C.E.Anderson
- Stigmaphyllon tomentosum A.Juss.
- Stigmaphyllon tonduzii C.E.Anderson
- Stigmaphyllon urenifolium A.Juss.
- Stigmaphyllon velutinum Planch. & Linden
- Stigmaphyllon venulosum Cuatrec.
- Stigmaphyllon vitifolium A.Juss.
- Stigmaphyllon yungasense C.E.Anderson
