= Dusen =

Dusen is a surname. Notable people with the surname include:

- Frankie Dusen (1878–1936), American trombonist
- Augustus S. F. X. Van Dusen, fictional character in a series of detective short stories and two novels by Jacques Futrelle
- Callendar–Van Dusen equation describes the relationship between resistance and temperature of platinum resistance thermometers
- Chris Van Dusen, American television screenwriter
- Clyde Van Dusen (1886–1951), American jockey and trainer of Thoroughbred racehorses
- Clyde Van Dusen (horse) (1926–1948), American Thoroughbred racehorse and the winner of the 1929 Kentucky Derby
- Francis Lund Van Dusen (1912–1993), United States federal judge
- Fred Van Dusen (1937–2018), former Major League Baseball player
- George W. Van Dusen (1826–1915), grain dealer who become rich from the milling boom in Minnesota
- Granville Van Dusen (born 1944), actor and voice actor who portrayed Race Bannon
- Julie Van Dusen, Canadian journalist who works for CBC News
- Willis Van Dusen, the mayor of Astoria, Oregon

== See also ==
- George W. and Nancy B. Van Dusen House, mansion in the Stevens Square neighborhood of Minneapolis, Minnesota
- Van Dusen v. Barrack, 376 U.S. 612 (1964), case decided by the United States Supreme Court
