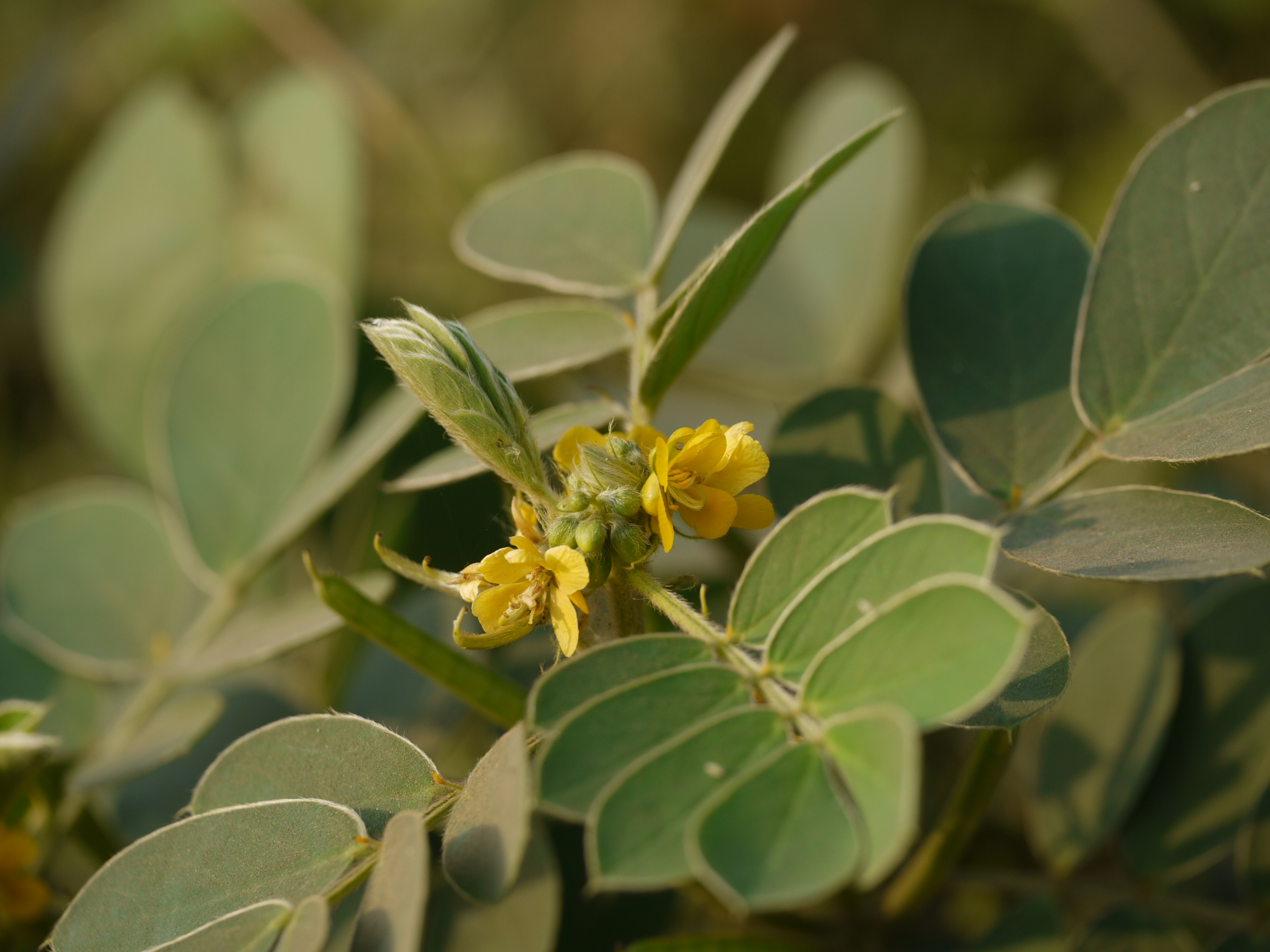
- Flowers and leaves
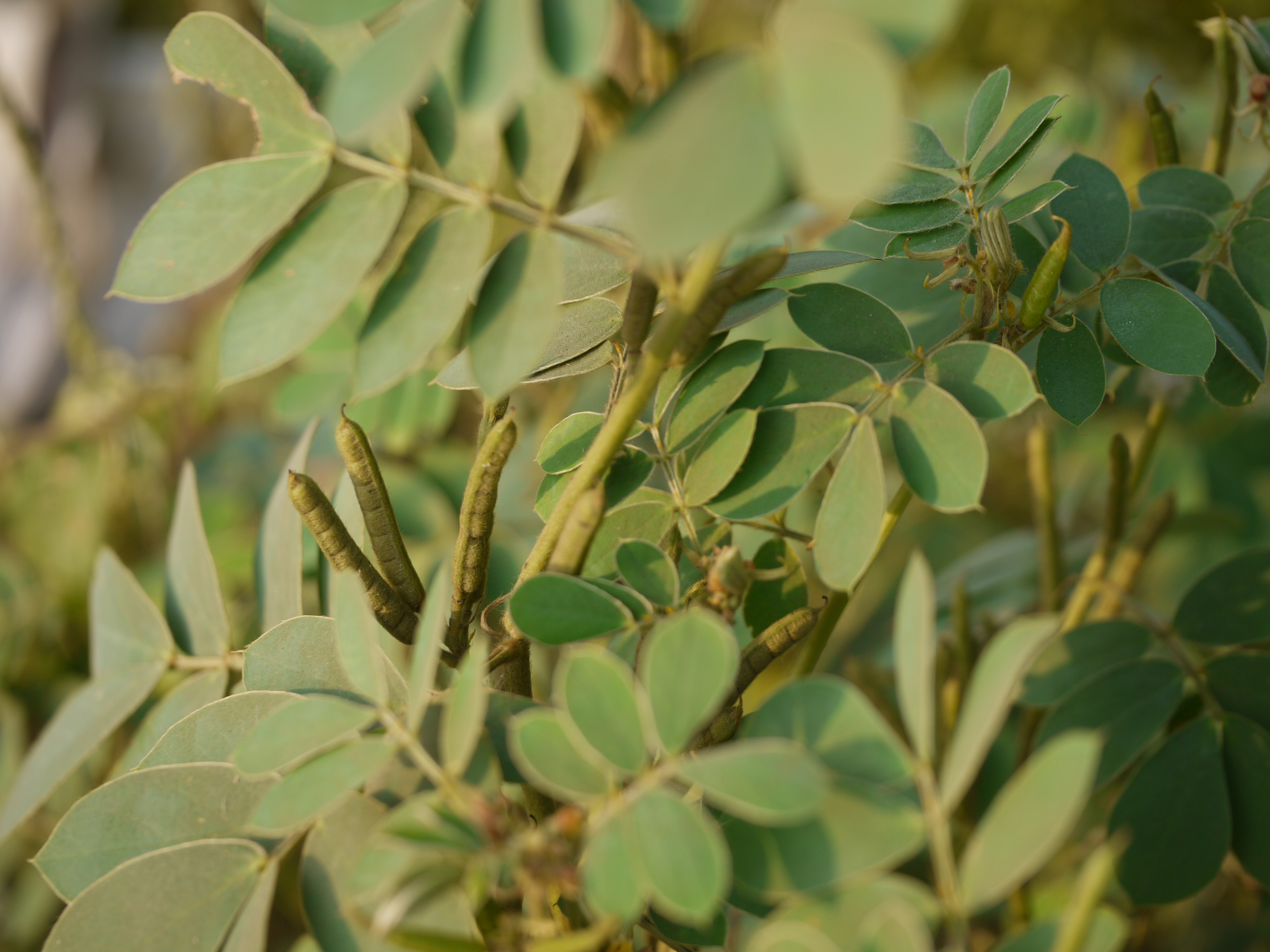
- Leaves and seedpods

Scientific classification
- Kingdom: Plantae
- Clade: Tracheophytes
- Clade: Angiosperms
- Clade: Eudicots
- Clade: Rosids
- Order: Fabales
- Family: Fabaceae
- Subfamily: Caesalpinioideae
- Genus: Senna
- Species: S. uniflora

Binomial name
- Senna uniflora (Mill.) H.S.Irwin & Barneby

Synonyms
- List: Cassia ciliata Hoffmanns.; Cassia monantha DC.; Cassia mucronulosa (Pittier) J.F.Macbr.; Cassia ornithopodioides Steud.; Cassia ornithopoides Lam.; Cassia sensitiva Jacq.; Cassia sericea Sw.; Cassia uniflora Mill.; Diallobus subuniflorus Raf.; Diallobus uniflorus (Mill.) Raf.; Emelista mucronulosa Pittier

= Senna uniflora =

Species of plant

Senna uniflora, the oneleaf senna, is a species of flowering plant in the family Fabaceae. It is native to Mexico, Central America, the Caribbean, Colombia, Venezuela, and most of Brazil, and has been introduced to India, Mauritius, and Réunion. Although it is somewhat weedy and invasive, it is used to out-compete the pernicious weed Parthenium hysterophorus.
