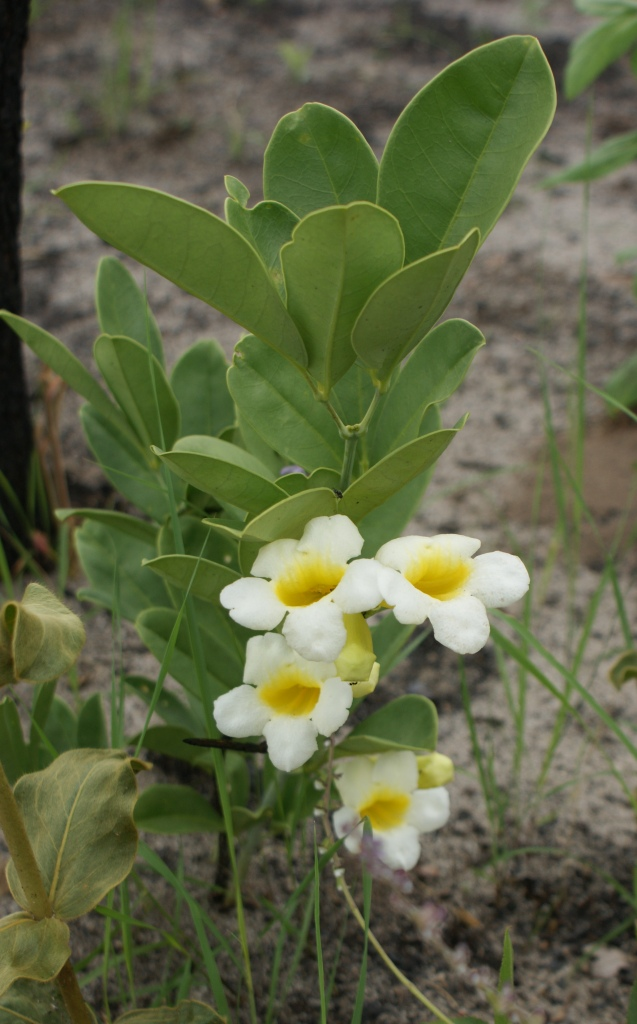

Scientific classification
- Kingdom: Plantae
- Clade: Tracheophytes
- Clade: Angiosperms
- Clade: Eudicots
- Clade: Asterids
- Order: Lamiales
- Family: Bignoniaceae
- Genus: Anemopaegma
- Species: A. glaucum

Binomial name
- Anemopaegma glaucum Mart. ex DC.

Synonyms
- Anemopaegma lanceifolium DC.; Anemopaegma triplinervium Mart. ex DC.

= Anemopaegma glaucum =

Species of flowering plant

Anemopaegma glaucum is a plant native to Caatinga and Cerrado vegetation in Brazil. This plant is cited in Flora Brasiliensis by Carl Friedrich Philipp von Martius.
