= Polaribacter =

Scientific classification
- Domain: Bacteria
- Kingdom: Pseudomonadati
- Phylum: Bacteroidota
- Class: Flavobacteriia
- Order: Flavobacteriales
- Family: Flavobacteriaceae
- Genus: Polaribacter; Gosink et al. 1998

Type species
- Polaribacter filamentus

Species
- P. aestuariivivens P. aquimarinus P. atrinae P. butkevichii P. dokdonensis P. filamentus P. franzmannii P. gangjinensis P. glomeratus P. haliotis P. huanghezhanensis P. insulae P. irgensii P. lacunae P. litorisediminis P. marinaquae P. marinivivus P. pacificus P. porphyrae P. reichenbachii P. sejongensis P. septentrionalilitoris P. staleyi P. tangerinus P. undariae P. vadi

Genus of bacteria

Polaribacter is a genus in the family Flavobacteriaceae. They are gram-negative, aerobic bacteria that can be heterotrophic, psychrophilic or mesophilic. Most species are non-motile and species range from ovoid to rod-shaped. Polaribacter forms yellow- to orange-pigmented colonies. They have been mostly adapted to cool marine ecosystems, and their optimal growth range is at a temperature between 10 and 32 °C and at a pH of 7.0 to 8.0. They are oxidase and catalase-positive and are able to grow using carbohydrates, amino acids, and organic acids.

There is evidence of two life strategies for members of the genus, Polaribacter. Some Polaribacter species are free-living and consume amino acids and carbohydrates, as well as have proteorhodopsin that enhances living in oligotrophic seawaters. Other species of Polaribacter attach to substrates in search of protein polymers.

In the context of climate change, algal blooms are becoming increasingly prevalent. Members of the genus Polaribacter decompose algal cells and thus may be important in biogeochemical cycling, as well as influence seawater chemistry and the composition of microbial communities as temperatures continue to rise. This may impact the efficiency of the biological pump in sequestering atmospheric carbon.

Polaribacter is a genus that is being continuously researched and to date there are 25 species that have been validly published under the International Code of Nomenclature of Prokaryotes (ICNP): P. aquimarinus, P. atrinae, P. butkevichii, P. dokdonensis, P. filamentus, P. franzmannii, P. gangjinensis, P. glomeratus, P. haliotis, P. huanghezhanensis, P. insulae, P. irgensii, P. lacunae, P. litorisediminis, P. marinaquae, P. marinivivus, P. pacificus, P. porphyrae, P. reichenbachii, P. sejongensis, P. septentrionalilitoris, P. staleyi, P. tangerinus, P. undariae, P. vadi.

The genus is sometimes incorrectly referred to as Polaribacer; Polarobacter or Polaribacteria.

== Phylogeny ==
This phylogeny is based on rRNA gene sequencing.

- Polaribacter
  - P. huanghezhanensis
  - - P. porphyrae
    - P. marinivivus
    - - P. aquimarinus
      - P. gangjinensis
      - - P. reichenbachii
        - P. marinaquae
        - - - P. dokdonensis
            - P.sp.MED152
            - - - P. insulae
                - P. vadi
                - - - P. litorisediminis
                    - P. haliotis
                    - - - P. tangerinus
                        - - P. atrinae
                          - - P. butkevichii
                            - - P. undariae
                              - - P. sejongensis
                      - - P. irgensii
                        - - P. franzmannii
                          - - P. filamentus
                            - - P. glomeratus
- outgroup
  Tenacibaculum

== Distribution and abundance ==
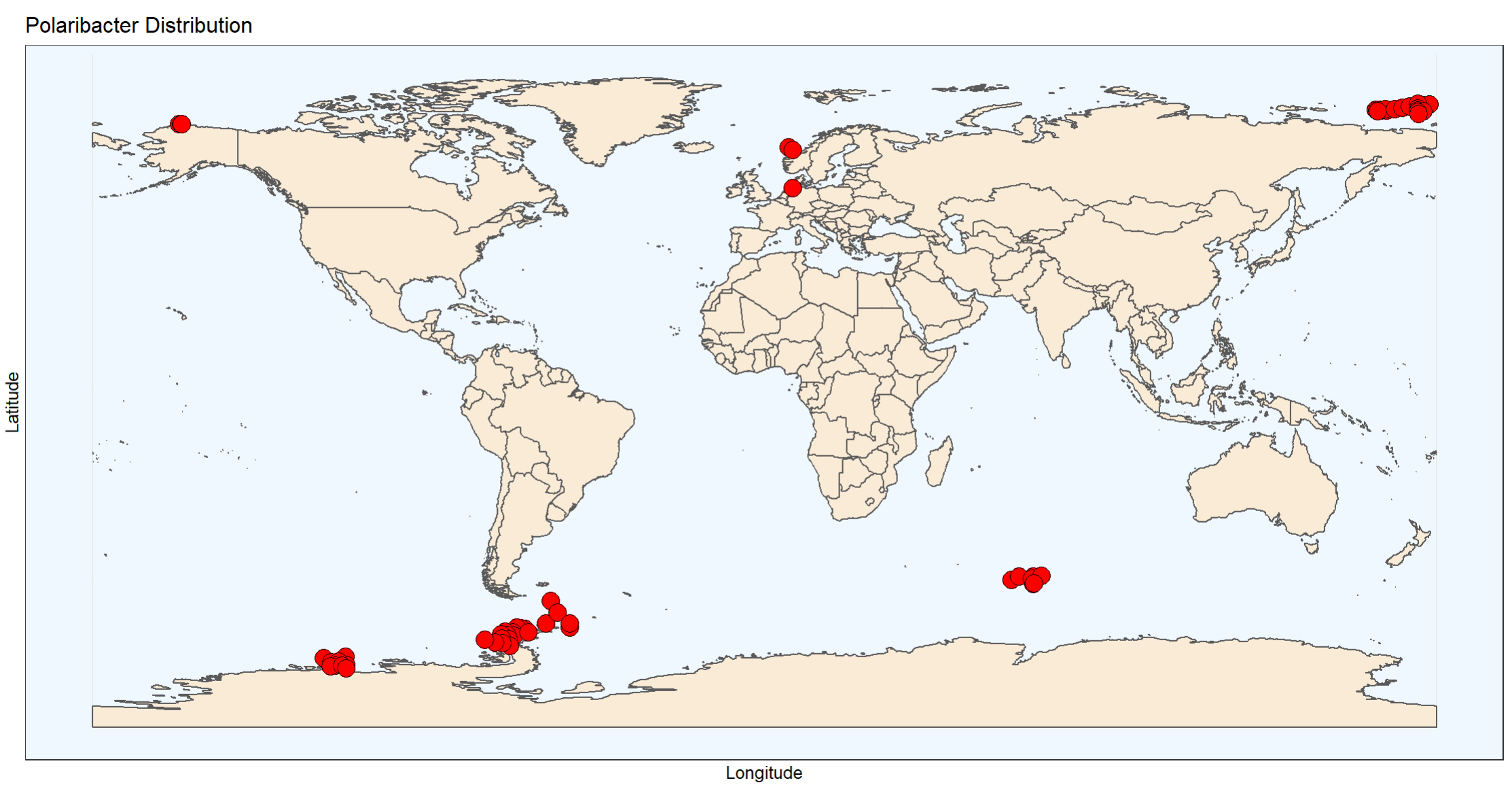
Collection sites (red circles) that have identified Polaribacter in water samples.

Members in the genus Polaribacter are abundant in polar oceans and are important in the export of dissolved organic matter (DOM). A small percentage of the bacterial community is responsible for the DOM uptake rate.

In northern latitude waters, the fraction of cells using glucose (fraction of active cells) is higher in summer than winter, and high abundances may occur after phytoplankton blooms, although a study in southern high-latitude waters found lower abundances of Polaribacter after an in situ diatom bloom.

Within the Arctic Ocean, there is no obvious pattern in the relative abundance between summer and winter. In the Chukchi Sea, the fraction of cells using leucine is higher in the winter than in summer. In the Beaufort Sea, the fraction of cells using leucine does not differ between seasons. In the coastal waters of Fildes Peninsula, Polaribacter dominated cells in the phylum Bacteriodetes.

=== Habitat ===
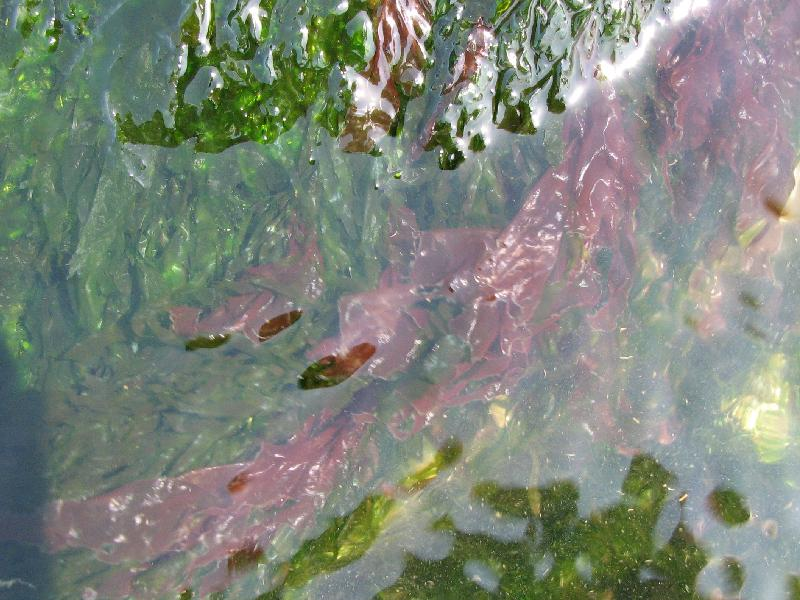
Porphyra yezoensis: Red macroalgae that inhabit Polaribacter.

Microorganisms in the genus Polaribacter are widely distributed and various species are capable of living in a plethora of different environments. Some Polaribacter species have been isolated from brine pools in the Arctic Ocean. in addition to hypersaline environments, numerous Polaribacter species inhabit extreme environments ranging from -20 °C to 22 °C. In the past, it was thought that Polaribacter only flourished in cold waters as the members of the species that were first discovered (P. irgensii, P. filamentus, and P. franzmannii) in the Arctic and Southern Oceans could only survive in water with temperatures ranging from -20 °C to 10 °C. Subsequently, members of the genus Polaribacter have been shown to be very versatile microorganisms and can survive in oligotrophic and in copiotrophic environments. Polaribacter have also been found in sediments. For example, SM1202T, a phylogenetically close strain to Polaribacter was isolated from marine sediment in Kongsfjorden, Svalbard. Polaribacter have also been experimentally isolated from red macroalgae (Porphyra yezoensis) and green macroalgae (Ulva fenestrate).

== Role in ecosystem ==
Isolates of related Flavobacteria are able to degrade High-Molecular Weight (HMW) DOM. and Polaribacter may be among the first organisms to degrade particulate organic matter and break-down polymers into smaller particles that can be used by free-living bacterial heterotrophs. This suggests that they likely remineralize primary production matter within the food web.

=== In the Southern Ocean ===
The Antarctic Peninsula exhibits strong seasonal changes, which influences how bacteria respond to and live in these environmental conditions. The Antarctic spring is especially important as it brings about significant changes, including sea ice melting, thermal stratification due to warming surface waters, and increased dissolved organic matter (DOM) production. All these physical changes also result in phytoplankton blooms which are important in supporting higher trophic levels.

In the Southern Ocean, flavobacteria dominate bacterial activity, particularly flavobacteria in the genus Polaribacter. Typically, these bacteria are prevalent in sea ice; however, during seasonal melting in the summer, they dominate coastal waters as sea ice retreats. In the Southern Ocean, when phytoplankton blooms occur, Flavobacteria, and particularly members in the genus Polaribacter, are among the first bacterial taxa to respond to phytoplankton blooms, breaking down organic matter by direct attachment and the use of exoenzymes. Both particle-attached and free-living members of the family Rhodobacteraceae were also found in close association with phytoplankton blooms; however, bacteria in this family were found to use lower molecular weight substrates. This suggests that they're secondary in the microbial succession of substrates, using the byproducts of degradation by flavobacteria, which also includes members of the genus Polaribacter. The relative abundance of free-living bacteria belonging to the genus Polaribacter and in the family Rhodobacteraceae peaked at different points during phytoplankton blooms, suggesting a niche specialization contributing to successive degradation of phytoplankton-derived organic matter. Bacteria in the genus Polaribacter and family Rhodobacteraceae were found in clusters, with Polaribacter clusters forming earlier in the bloom, which further suggests a successive ecological interaction between various bacterial taxa.

For both the Arctic Ocean and the North Sea, Polaribacter exhibited similar trends pertaining to phytoplankton blooms in the summertime as well as assuming particular niches for organic matter degradation.

== Metabolism ==
Members of the genus Polaribacter are metabolically flexible depending on their physiology, lifestyle and seasonality of the region they inhabit. Many research studies have found that Polaribacter can alternate between two lifestyles as a mechanism for adaptation in surface waters where nutrient concentrations are low and light exposure is high. Sequenced strains of the genus Polaribacter show a high prevalence of peptidase and glycoside hydrolase genes in comparison to other bacteria in the Flavobacteriaceae, indicating they contribute to degradation and uptake of external proteins and oligopeptides.

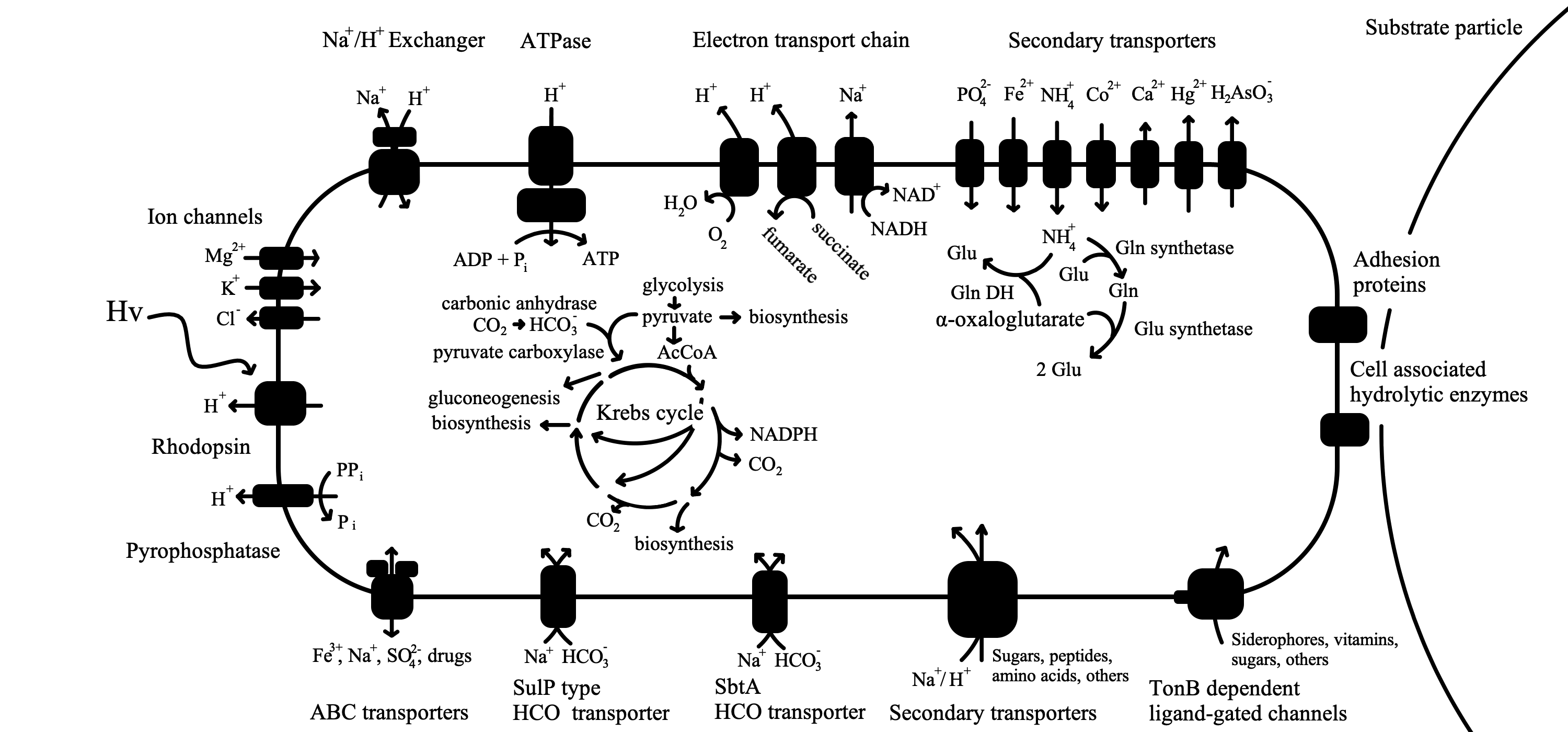
Schematic diagram representing transporters in the membrane of Polaribacter strain MED152.

In the pelagic water column, some species are well equipped to attach to particles and substrates to search for and degrade polymers. They are amongst the first organisms to degrade particulate organic matter and break-down polymers into smaller particles. Studies have shown that they will colonize and attach to particles, glide to search for substrates, and degrade them for carbon and nutrients. Once they've degraded these molecules, the bacterium may then search for new particles to colonize, forcing them to freely-swim in environments where nutrients and organic carbon is not easily available.

=== CAZymes ===
Genetic sequencing found that strains contain numerous genes which encode for CAZymes that are involved in polysaccharide degradation. For example, strain DSW-5 (a strain genetically very similar to strain MED-152), contains 85 genes encoding to CAZymes and 203 peptidases, which suggests its role as a free-living heterotrophs. However, the ratio of peptidases to glycoside hydrolase genes varies depending on the environmental conditions the strain is subjected to. For example, Polaribacter sp. MED134 lives in environmental conditions with extended starvation conditions and expresses twice as many peptidases as CAZymes. On the other hand, macroalgae-colonizing species that live in stable, eutrophic environments may express greater proportions of CAZymes than peptidases.

=== Proteorhodopsin ===
"Free-living" species have the proteorhodopsin gene, which allows them to complete inorganic-carbon fixation using light as an energy source. By utilizing their proteorhodopsin to use light energy, Polaribacter can grow in oligotrophic environmental conditions.

== Genome ==
=== General genome characteristics ===
The genome of bacteria in the genus Polaribacter vary in size from 2.76 Mb (P. irgensii) to 4.10 Mb (P. reichenbachii) and the number of genes ranging from 2446 in P. irgensii to 3500 in P. reichenbachii, but have a fairly constant G+C content of approximately 30 mol%. Some notable features of the genome include genes for agar, alginate, and carrageenan degrading enzymes in Polaribacter species which colonize the surface of macroalgae. Agar degrading enzymes have also been found in strains of Polaribacter that colonize the gut of the comb pen shell. Proteases are also commonly found in the genomes of species that preferentially grow on solid substrates and degrade protein instead of using free amino acids and living a pelagic lifestyle. Some members of the genus encode proteorhodopsin, which has been implicated in supporting their central metabolism through photophosphorylation.

=== DNA sequencing of Polaribacter ===
DNA sequencing has commonly been used to identify new strains of Polaribacter and help place species on a phylogenetic tree. DNA sequencing has also been used to help understand, or predict a species role in an environment due to the presence of certain genes. Members of the family Flavobacteriaceae can be identified through the specific quinone, Menaquinone 6, also known as Vitamin K2; however, differentiating species can be much more difficult. Species such as Polaribacter vadi and Polaribacter atrinae were identified as new species based on their similar but unique genome when compared to other members of the genus Polaribacter. New species can be identified through DNA hybridization or through the sequencing and comparison of a common gene such as 16S rRNA. This has allowed scientists to create phylogenetic trees of the genus based on genomic similarity, as seen in the phylogeny section, as well as identify common features in the genome.

=== Life strategies of Polaribacter based on genome analysis ===
Genomic analysis has allowed scientists to examine the relationships between different species of Polaribacter. However, by combining genomic analysis with other analytical techniques such as chemotaxonomic and biochemical, scientists can theorize how a species might fit into an environment or how they believe a species is adapted to survive. A genomic analysis of the Polaribacter strain MED152, found a considerable amount of genes that allow for surface or particle attachment, gliding motility and polymer degradation. These genes fit with the current understanding of how marine bacteroidetes survive through attaching to a surface and moving over it to look for nutrients. However the researchers also noticed that the organism had a proteorhodopsin gene as well as other genes which could be used to sense light and found that under light the species increased carbon dioxide fixation. This led the researchers to theorize that Polaribacter strain MED152 has two different life strategies, one where it acts like other marine bacteroidetes, attaching to surfaces and searching for nutrients and, another life strategy where, if the strain was in a well lit, low nutrient area of the ocean, it would use carbon fixation to synthesize intermediates of metabolic pathways.

Another example of this comes from the Polaribacter strains Hel1_33_49 and Hel1_85. The strain Hel1_33_49 has a genome which contains proteorhodopsin, fewer polysaccharide utilization loci and no mannitol dehydrogenase, which the researchers associate with a pelagic lifestyle. Hel1_85 on the other hand, has a genome which contains twice as many polysaccharide utilization loci, a mannitol dehydrogenase and no proteorhodopsin, pointing to a lifestyle with lower oxygen availability such as a biofilm.

==== Species ====
Name	Type strain	DNA G+C content (mol%)	Description
P. aestuariivivens	JDTF-33, KCTC 52838, NBRC 112782	41.7	Ovoid, coccoid or rod-shaped. Form smooth, glistening, circular, and yellowish-white colonies.
P. aquimarinus	ZY113, KCTC 62374, MCCC 1H00296	30.1	Rod-shaped. Form smooth, circular, and orange colonies
P. atrinae	WP2, KACC 17473, JCM 19202	30.4	Rod-shaped, aerobic and non-motile. Form circular, convex, yellow-orange colonies.
P. butkevichii	KMM 3938, KCTC 12100, CCUG 48005	32.4	Rod-shaped, mesophillic cells.
P. dokdonensis	DSW-5, DSM 17204, KCTC 12392	30.0	Straight or curved rod-shaped. Form smooth, convex, orange colonies.
P. filamentus	215, ATCC 700397, CIP 106479	32.0	Filamentous or rod-shaped. Form gas vesicles. Form orange, flat-convex colonies.
P. franzmannii	301, ATCC 700399, CIP 106480.	32.5	Filamentous or rod-shaped. Psychrophilic or psychrotolerant. Form gas vesicles.
P. gangjinensis	K17-16, JCM 16152, KCTC 22729	34.6	Gliding motility. Mesophillic. Form smooth, convex, and circular colonies.
P. glomeratus	ATCC 43844, CIP 103112, LMG 13858	33.0	Curved or coiled. Psychrophilic or psychrotolerant.
P. haliotis	RA4-7, KCTC 52418, NBRC 112383	29.9	Ovoid or rod-shaped. Form smooth, glistening, convex, and light yellow colonies.
P. huanghezhanensis	SM1202, CCTCC AB 2013148, KCTC 32516	36.4	Rod-shaped. Form glistening, circular, and orange colonies.
P. insulae	OITF-22, KCTC 52658, NBRC 112706	32.3	Ovoid or rod-shaped. Form smooth, glistening, circular, and light orange-yellow colonies.
P. irgensii	23-P, ATCC 700398, CIP 106478	34.5	Filamentous or rod-shaped. Form gas vesicles. Psychrophilic or psychrotolerant. Form translucent, circular, and orange colonies.
P. lacunae	HMF2268, KCTC 42191, CECT 8862	34.3	Rod-shaped. Form smooth, circular, and yellow colonies.
P. litorisediminis	OITF-11, KCTC 52500, NBRC 112457	32.2	Filamentous, ovoid, or rod-shaped. Form smooth, glistening, circular, and light orange-yellow colonies.
P. marinaquae	RZW3-2, JCM 30825, KCTC 42664, MCCC1K00696	30.5	Rod-shaped. Form circular, convex, and yellow colonies.
P. marinivivus	GYSW-15, CECT 8655, KCTC 42156	31.2	Rod-shaped. Form smooth, glistening, circular, and yellow colonies.
P. pacificus	HRA130-1, KCTC 52370, MCCC 1K03199, JCM31460, CGMCC 1.15763	35.9	Rod-shaped. Form circular, nontransparent, and yellow colonies.
P. porphyrae	LNM-20, LMG 26671, NBRC 108759	28.6	Rod-shaped with pointy ends. Lack gas vesicles and polar flagella. Form circular, convex, and pale yellow colonies.
P. reichenbachii	6Alg 8, KCTC 23969, LMG 26443	29.1–29.5	Rod-shaped. Form shiny, circular, and yellow colonies.
P. sejongensis	KOPRI 21160, KCTC 23670, JCM 18092	29.8	Rod-shaped. Form circular, convex, and light yellow colonies.
P. septentrionalilitoris	ANORD1, DSM 110039, NCIMB 15081, MTCC 12685	30.6	Cocci or rod-shaped. Form translucent, circular, and bright yellow colonies.
P. staleyi	10Alg 139, KCTC 5277, KMM 6729	31.8	Rod-shaped. Form shiny, circular, and yellow colonies.
P. tangerinus	S2-14, KCTC 52275, MCCC 1H00163	31.2	Ovoid or rod-shaped. Form smooth, circular, and orange colonies.
P. undariae	W-BA7, KCTC 42175, CECT 8670	31.9	Ovoid or rod-shapted. Form smooth, glistening, circular, and pale yellow colonies.
P. vadi	LPB0003, KACC 18704, JCM 31217	29.6	Curved and rod-shaped. Form circular, convex, and yellow colonies.

== Viral pathogens ==
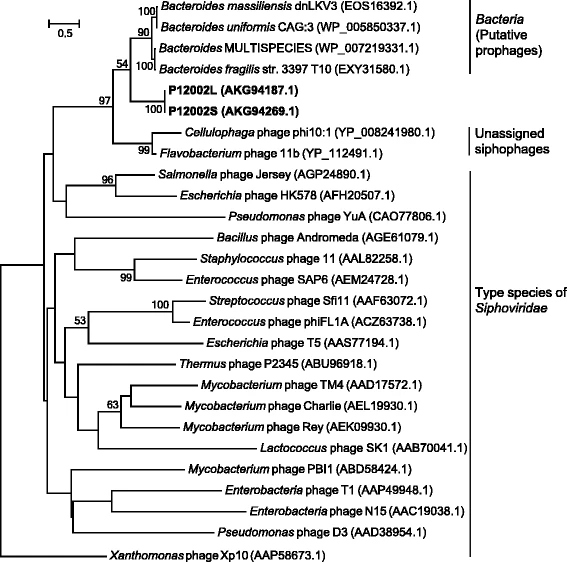
Phylogenetic tree of different viruses infecting Flavobacteriia.

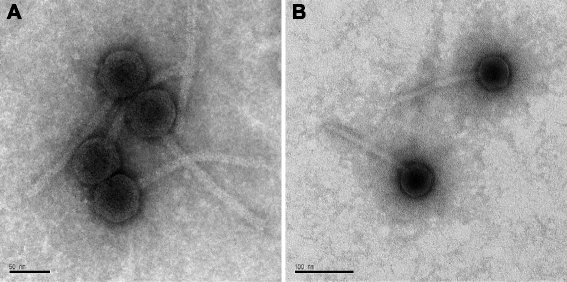
Siphoviruses of class Caudoviricetes infecting Polaribacter strains: species Incheonvirus P12002L (Polaribacter phage P12002L, a) and species Incheonvirus P12002S (Polaribacter phage P12002S, b). Capsids are round and dark, tails can be seen extending out from the capsids.

Only two species of lytic phage are known to infect members of this genus, and both have double stranded DNA with virions that include isometric heads and non-contractile tails (class Caudoviricetes, morphotype: siphoviruses). Viral lysis has been implicated as a major driver of changes in genus-level composition of microbial communities.

== Applications/uses ==
Cold water enzymes contained in psychrophilic bacteria like Polaribacter are valuable for biotechnology applications since they do not require high temperatures that may other enzyme systems do.

=== Psychrophilic enzymes ===
Polaribacter is a psychrophilic bacterium that lends itself to a variety of applications in both academic and industrial settings. These cold dwelling bacteria are an abundant source of psychrophilic enzymes which have an interesting ability to retain higher catalytic activity at temperatures below 25 °C. This is due to the highly malleable nature of these enzymes as this allows for better substrate - active site binding at colder temperatures. This is important as enzymes that operate at lower temperatures not only make the industrial processes more efficient, but they also minimize the chance of side reactions occurring. More of the substrate can directly be converted into the desired product all the while requiring less energy to do so. Psychrophilic enzymes can also aid with heat labile or volatile compounds, allowing reactions to occur without significant product loss. Another unique application for these enzymes is the ability to be inhibited without the need of external reagents. Usually to stop enzyme activity, chemical inhibitors are required which then require subsequent purification steps. With psychrophilic enzymes you can add slight heat to prevent any further reaction from occurring. Psychrophilic proteases derived from Polaribacter can be added to detergents allowing the washing of fabric at room temperature.

An example of this is the enzyme carrageenase, which has been shown to have anti-tumor, antiviral, antioxidant and immunomodulatory activities. However, carrageenase isolated from bacteria has historically had low enzyme activity and poor stability. Recently researchers have isolated and cloned the carrageenase gene from the Polaribacter sp. NJDZ03, which shows better thermostability, and the ability to be active at lower temperatures, making it a better choice for industrial uses.

=== Exopolysaccharide ===
EPS is a secreted exopolysaccharide which protects the cells, stabilizes membranes, and serve and carbon stores. Most EPS is similar but it is found that in extremophiles, the composition may be distinct. Specifically in Polaribacter sp. SM1127, where the EPS has antioxidant activity and has shown to protect human fibroblast cells at lower temperatures. Studies by Sun et al. were done to determine whether this can be utilized to protect and repair damage caused by frostbite. It was found that Polaribacter derived EPS helps facilitate the dermal fibroblast cell movement to the site of injury. This not only promotes healing during frostbite injury but other cutaneous wounds as well/
