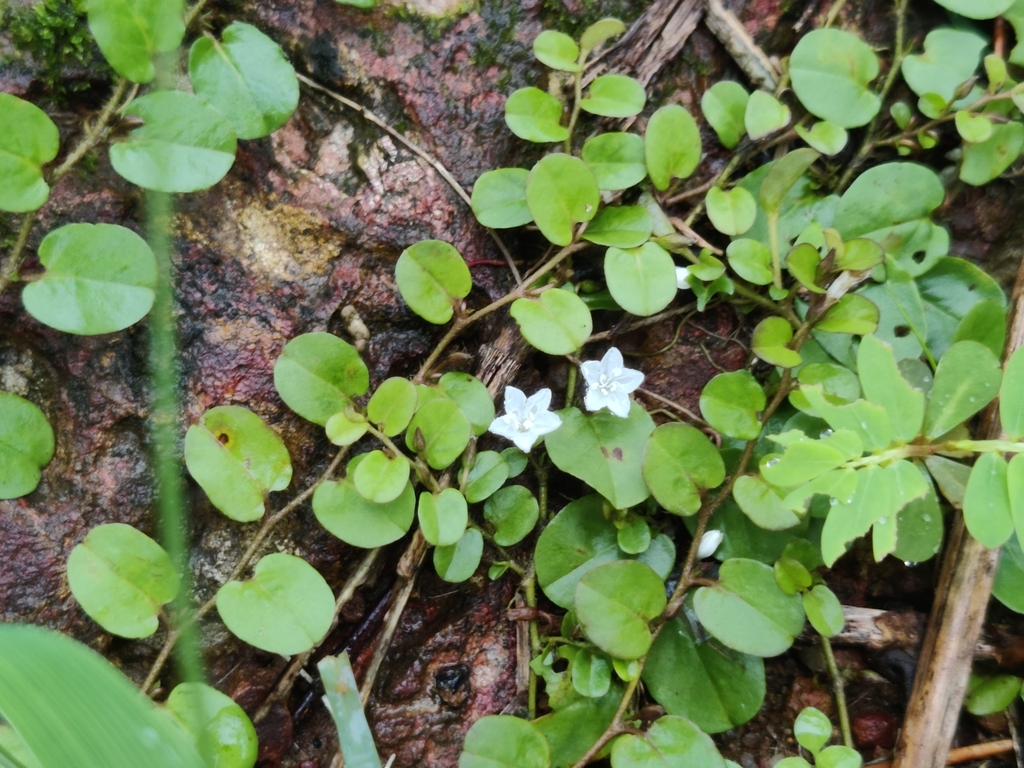

Scientific classification
- Kingdom: Plantae
- Clade: Tracheophytes
- Clade: Angiosperms
- Clade: Eudicots
- Clade: Asterids
- Order: Solanales
- Family: Convolvulaceae
- Genus: Evolvulus
- Species: E. nummularius

Binomial name
- Evolvulus nummularius (L.) L.

= Evolvulus nummularius =

Species of flowering plant

Evolvulus nummularius, also known as the dwarf morning glory, is a species of flowering plant in the morning-glory family. It is an annual or perennial plant.

== Distribution ==
The plant is distributed throughout the tropics and subtropics, extending across large parts of tropical Africa, South Africa, and Madagascar. It is considered a naturalized alien plant in Taiwan and the Tiwi Islands of Australia.

== Uses ==
The plant is used as a mild sedative and has anthelmintic properties. In Indian traditional medicines it is used for treating burns, cuts, wounds, scorpion stings, and as an anthelmintic. Phytochemical investigations of the aerial parts of E. nummularius have identified several bioactive constituents such as β-sitosterol, glucoside, stigmasterol, d-mannitol, ursolic acid, and oleanolic acid. In addition, three previously unreported compounds were isolated and structurally elucidated using spectroscopic and chemical methods, comprising derivatives of stigmastane, coumaroyl, and ursane.
