= Mannitol 2-dehydrogenase =

mannitol 2-dehydrogenase

Identifiers
- EC no.: 1.1.1.67
- CAS no.: 9001-65-4

Databases
- IntEnz: IntEnz view
- BRENDA: BRENDA entry
- ExPASy: NiceZyme view
- KEGG: KEGG entry
- MetaCyc: metabolic pathway
- PRIAM: profile
- PDB structures: RCSB PDB PDBe PDBsum
- Gene Ontology: AmiGO / QuickGO
Search
- PMC: articles
- PubMed: articles
- NCBI: proteins

In enzymology, a mannitol 2-dehydrogenase (EC 1.1.1.67) is an enzyme that catalyzes the chemical reaction

Mannitol
+ NAD^{+}
H^{+}
H^{+}
Fructose
+ NADH

The two substrates of this enzyme are D-mannitol and oxidised nicotinamide adenine dinucleotide (NAD^{+}). Its products are D-fructose (shown in its keto form), reduced NADH, and a proton.

This enzyme belongs to the family of oxidoreductases, specifically those acting on the CH-OH group of donor with NAD^{+} or NADP^{+} as acceptor. The systematic name of this enzyme class is D-mannitol:NAD^{+} 2-oxidoreductase. Other names in common use include D-mannitol dehydrogenase, and mannitol dehydrogenase. This enzyme participates in fructose and mannose metabolism.

== Structural studies ==
As of late 2007, two structures have been solved for this class of enzymes, with PDB accession codes 1LJ8 and 1M2W.
