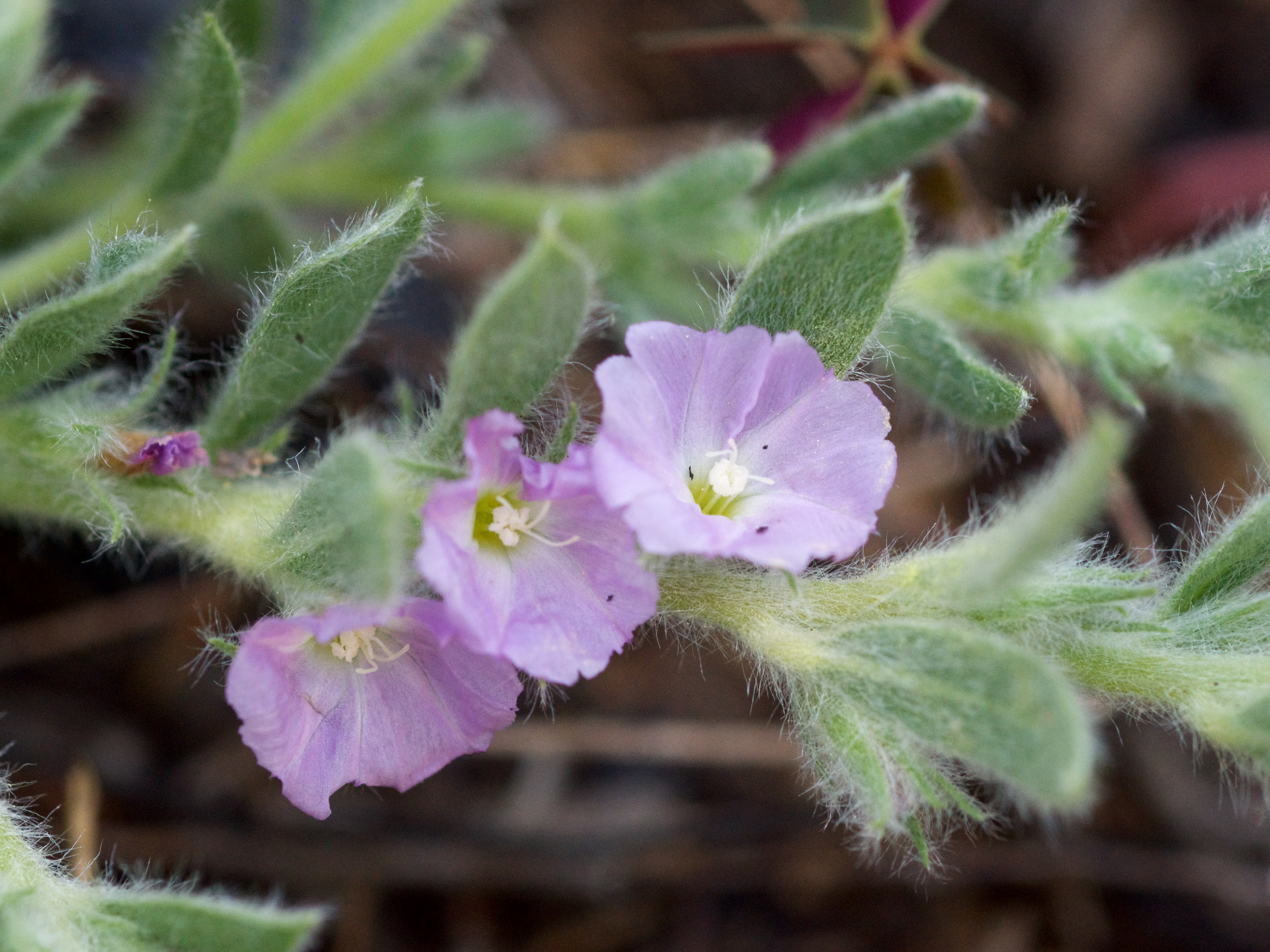

Conservation status
- Secure (NatureServe)

Scientific classification
- Kingdom: Plantae
- Clade: Tracheophytes
- Clade: Angiosperms
- Clade: Eudicots
- Clade: Asterids
- Order: Solanales
- Family: Convolvulaceae
- Genus: Evolvulus
- Species: E. nuttallianus

Binomial name
- Evolvulus nuttallianus L.

= Evolvulus nuttallianus =

Species of flowering plant

Evolvulus nuttallianus is a species of flowering plant in the morning-glory family known by the common name shaggy dwarf morning-glory. It is found in the central United States.
