= Polaribacter septentrionalilitoris =

Scientific classification
- Domain: Bacteria
- Kingdom: Pseudomonadati
- Phylum: Bacteroidota
- Class: Flavobacteriia
- Order: Flavobacteriales
- Family: Flavobacteriaceae
- Genus: Polaribacter
- Species: P. septentrionalilitoris

Binomial name
- Polaribacter septentrionalilitoris Choo et al. 2020

Species of bacterium

Polaribacter septentrionalilitoris is a species of Gram-negative, non-motile temperate marine bacteria, traits typical of members of the genus Polaribacter. This strain was originally isolated from the biofilm of a stone collected at Nordstrand, which is a tiny peninsula on the German portion of the North Sea. Lab culture tests have found it to be mesophilic in nature. Colonies of this strain are pigmented bright yellow when grown on agar. P. septentrionalilitoris also demonstrates robust growth on hypersaline agar. Its type strain is ANORD1^{T} (=DSM 110039^{T}=NCIMB 15081^{T}=MTCC 12685^{T}).
