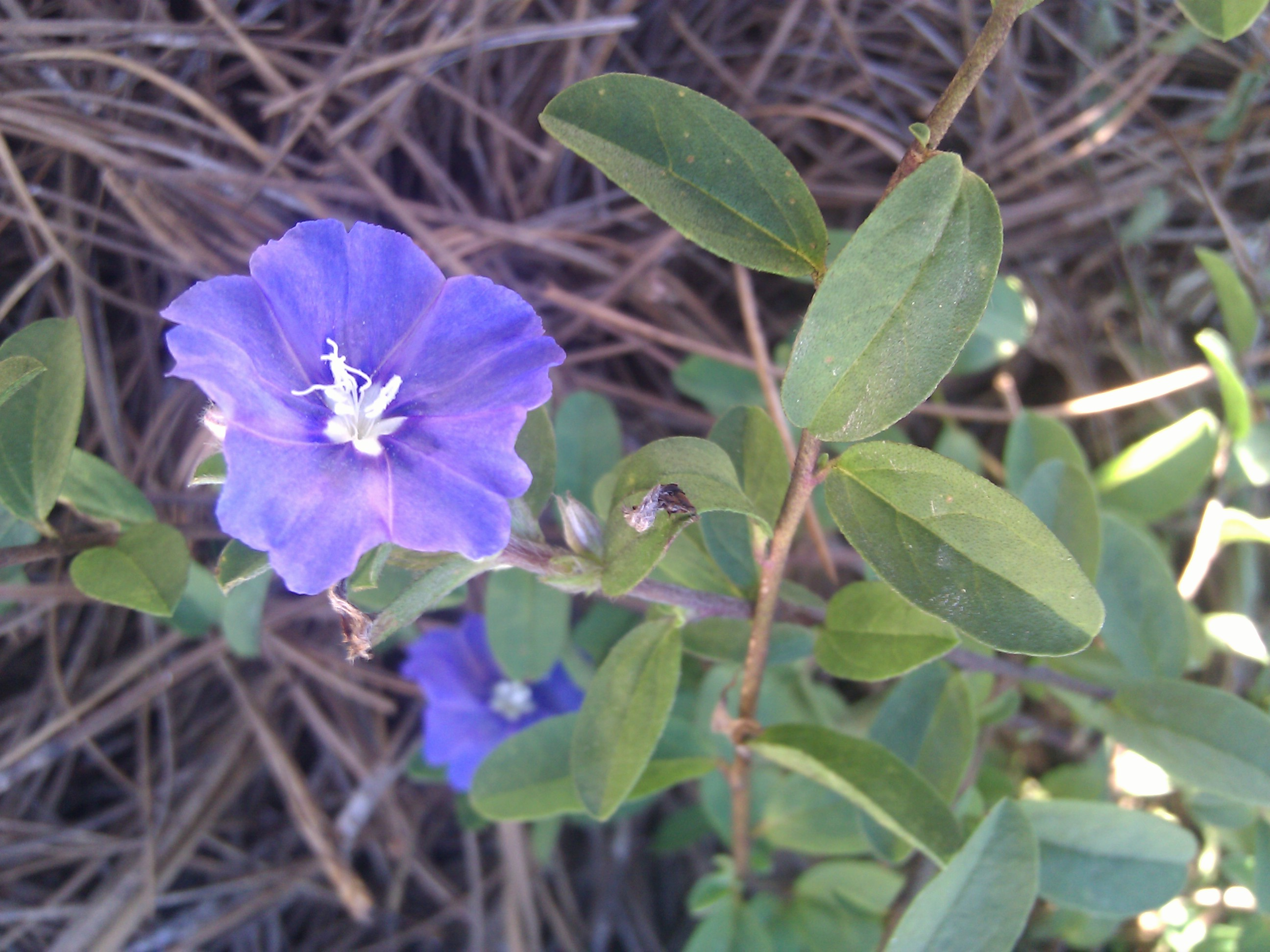

Scientific classification
- Kingdom: Plantae
- Clade: Tracheophytes
- Clade: Angiosperms
- Clade: Eudicots
- Clade: Asterids
- Order: Solanales
- Family: Convolvulaceae
- Genus: Evolvulus
- Species: E. glomeratus

Binomial name
- Evolvulus glomeratus Nees & Mart.

= Evolvulus glomeratus =

Species of flowering plant

Evolvulus glomeratus, commonly known as blue daze, Brazilian dwarf morning-glory, or Hawaiian blue eyes, is flowering plant from the family Convolvulaceae that is native to Brazil, Guyana, Bolivia and Venezuela.

== Description ==
It is an evergreen subshrub that spreads to 60-90 cm in diameter with stems that become woody as they mature. Both leaves and stems have a light grey fuzz.

The lavender-coloured flowers, with blueish petals, are funnel-shaped and are borne in leaf axils proximate to the stem tips. The flowers open in the morning and close by the evening. The plant flowers from summer to fall.

== Subspecies ==
The species is divided into three subspecies:

- Evolvulus glomeratus subsp. glomeratus Nees & Mart.
- Evolvulus glomeratus subsp. grandiflorus (Parodi) Ooststr.
- Evolvulus glomeratus subsp. obtusus (Meisn.) Ooststr.

== Gallery ==
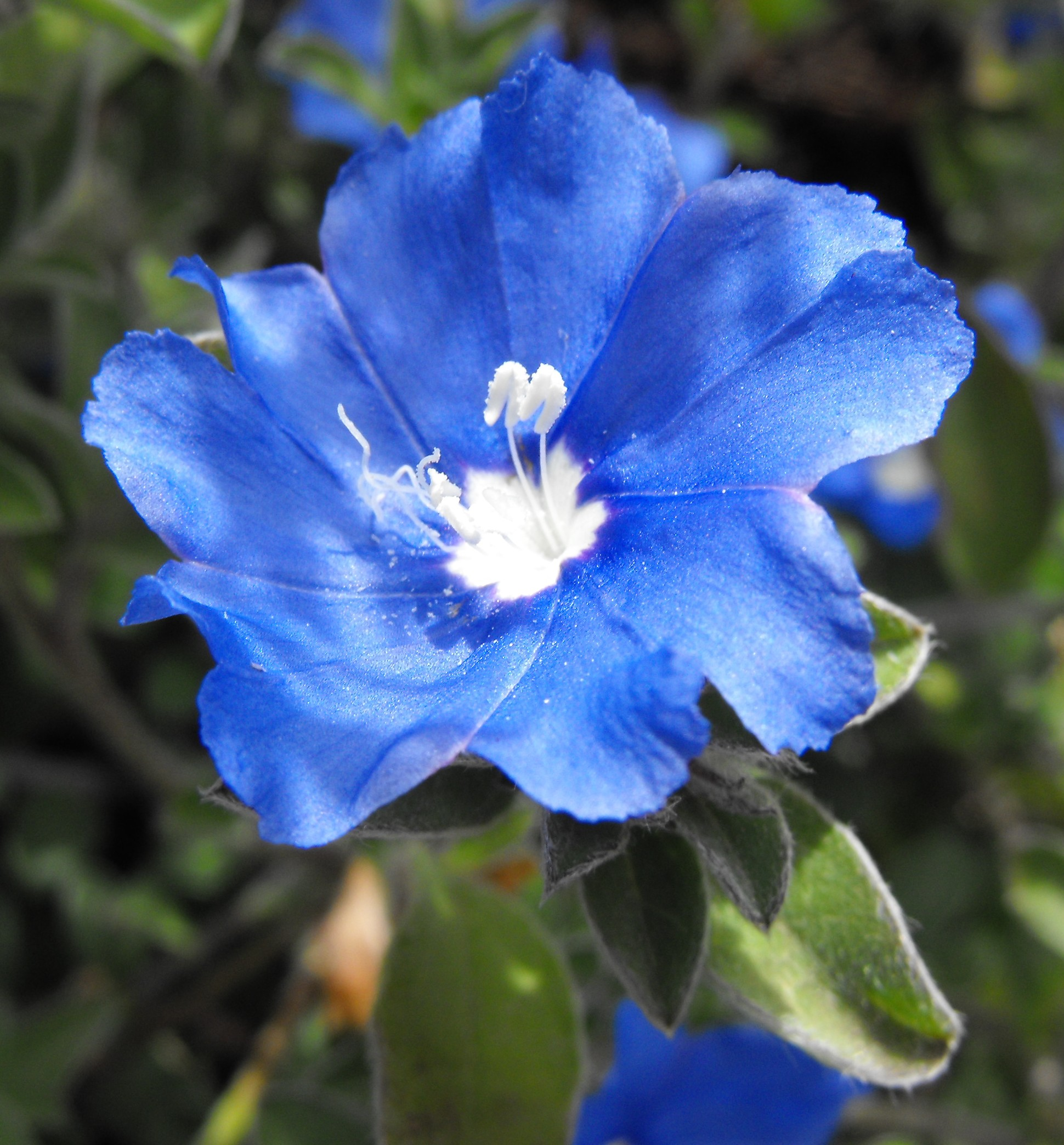
Flower closeup

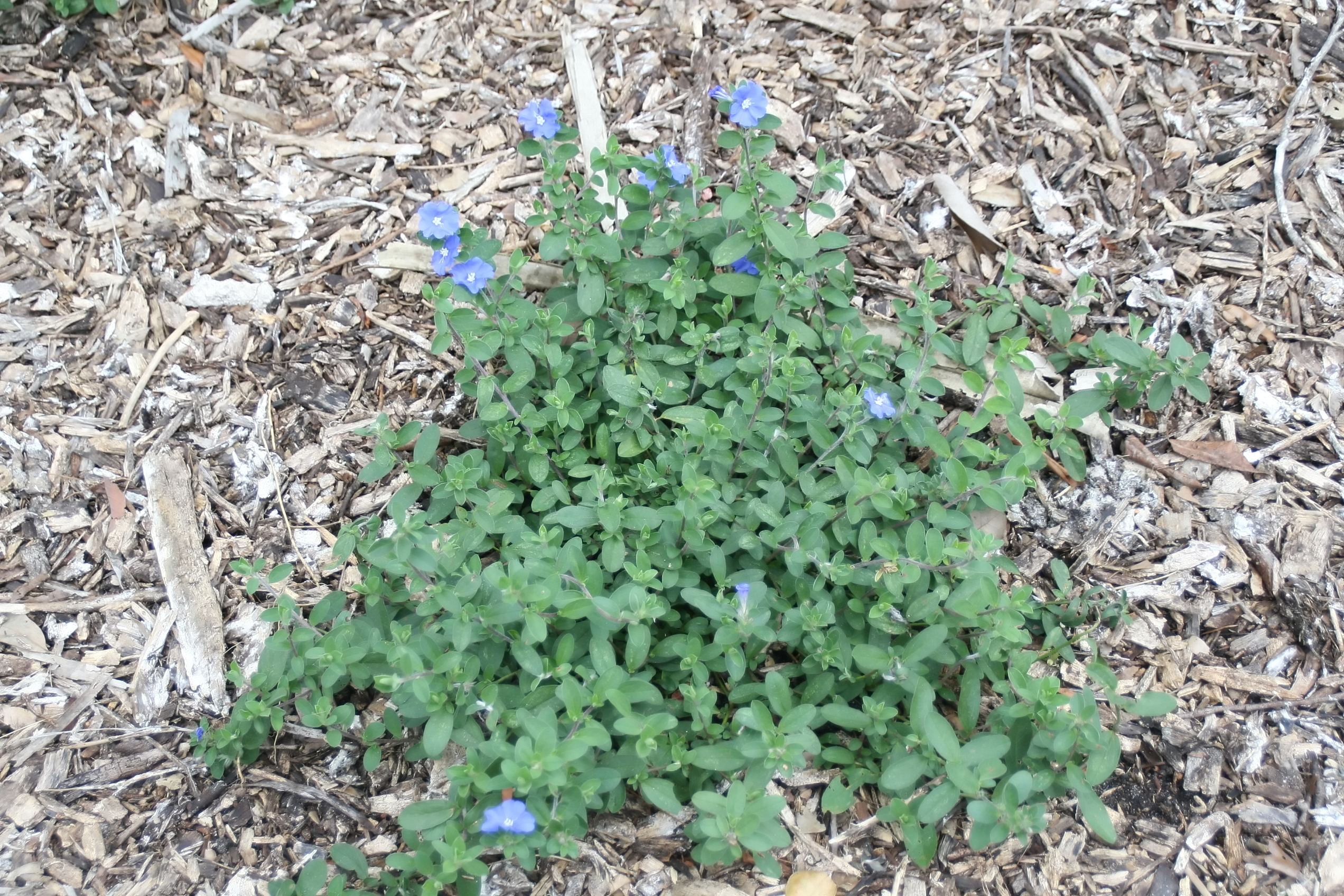
Matting form

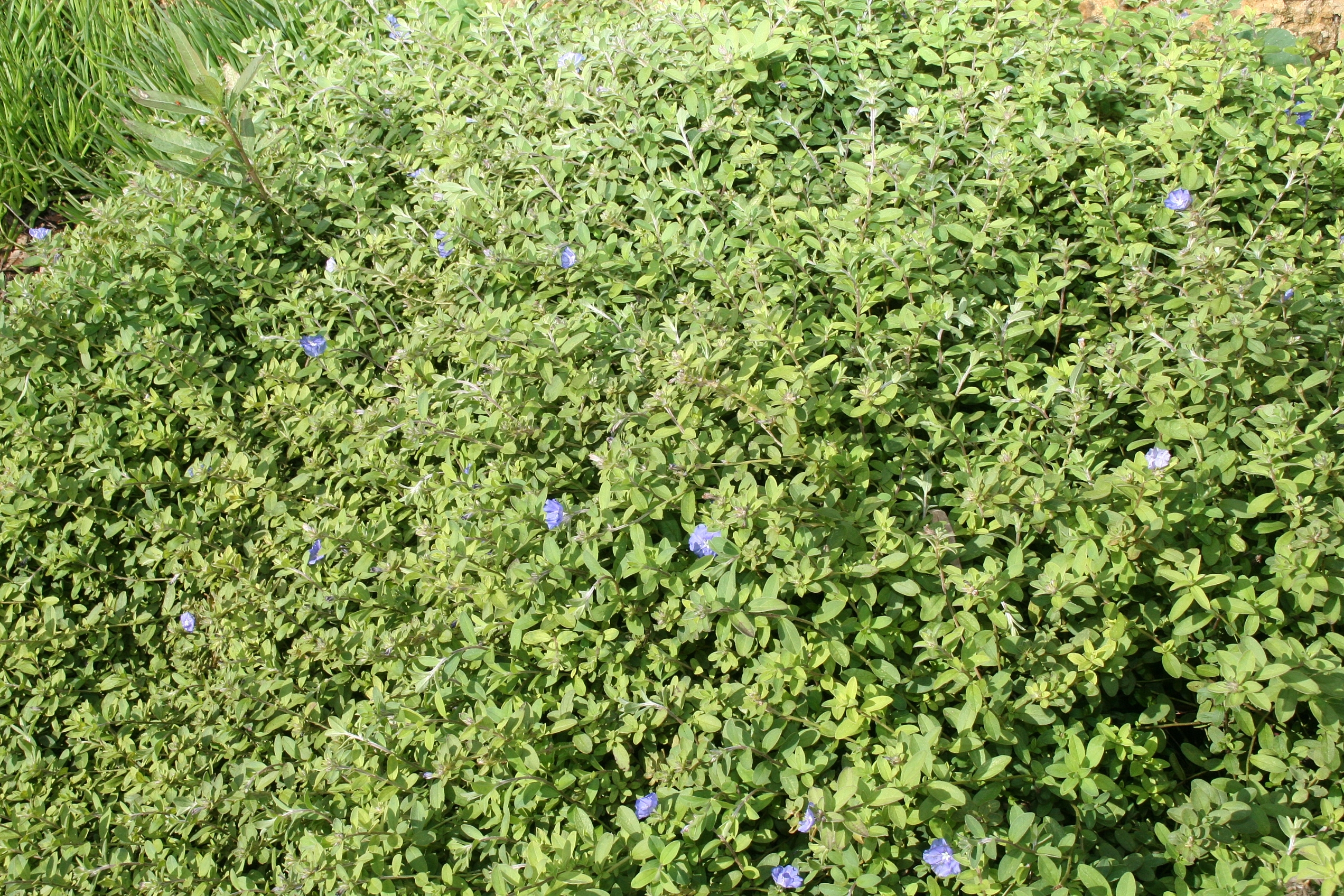
Shrub form

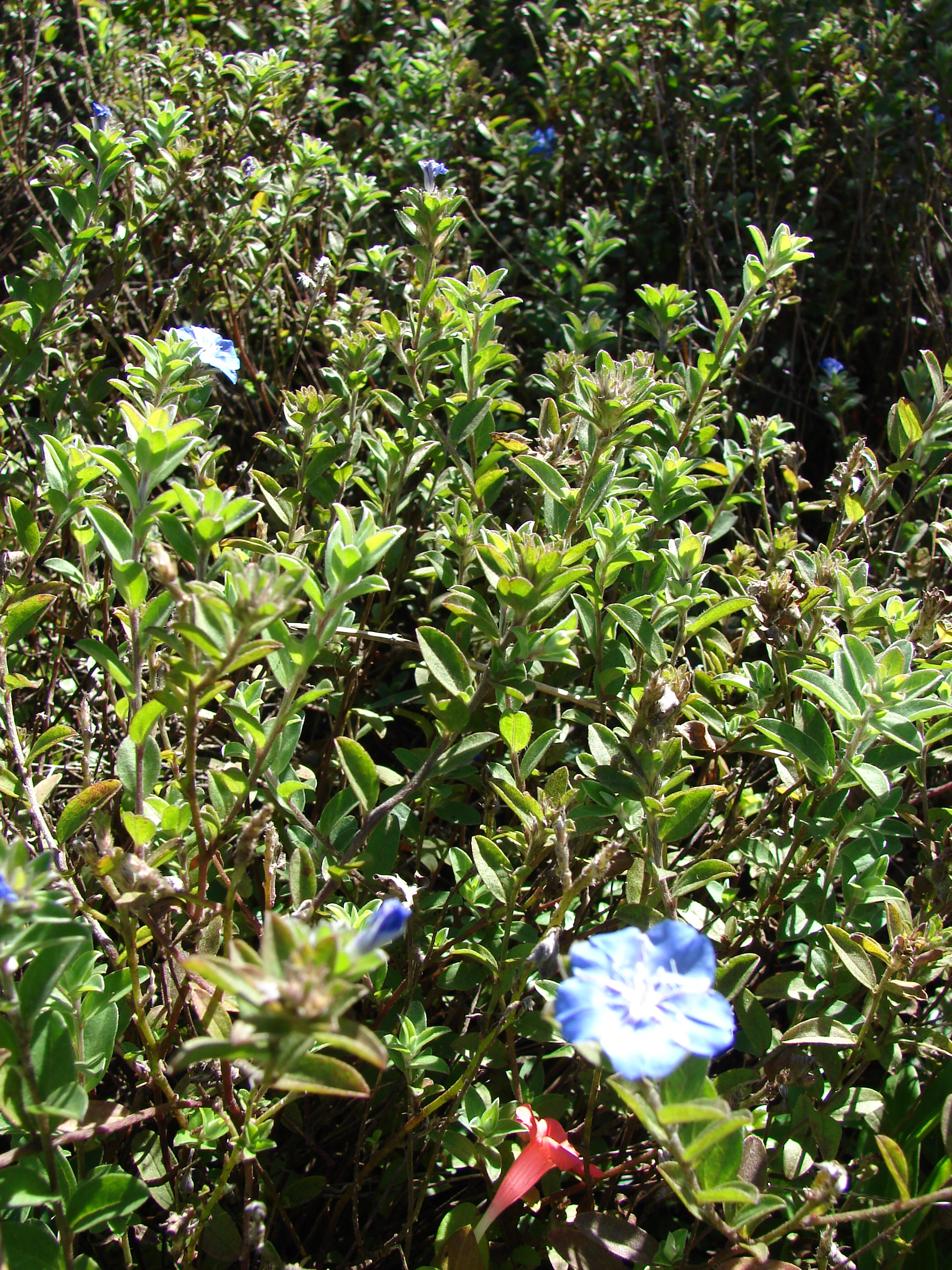
Emerging flowers

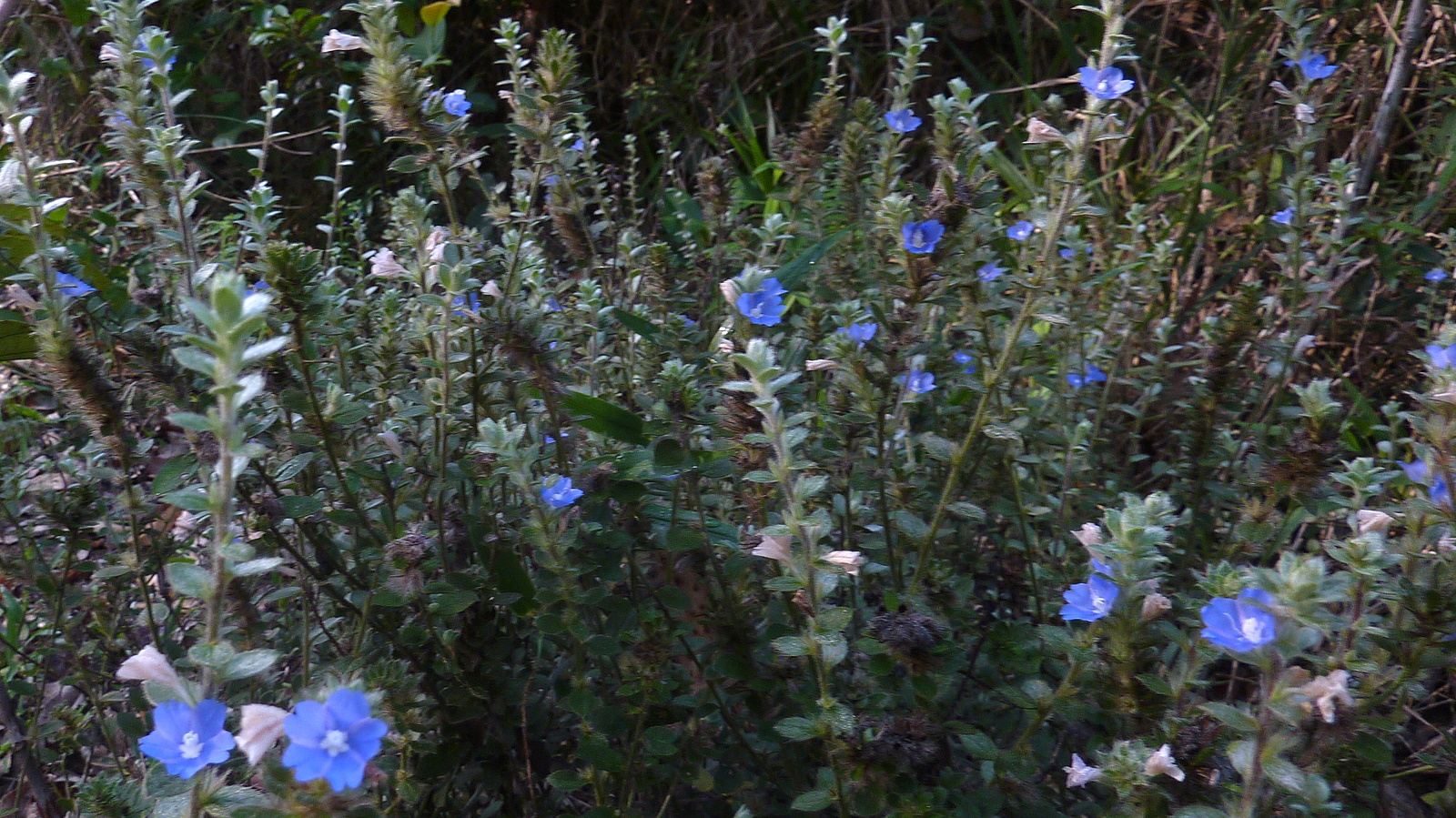
Growing upright

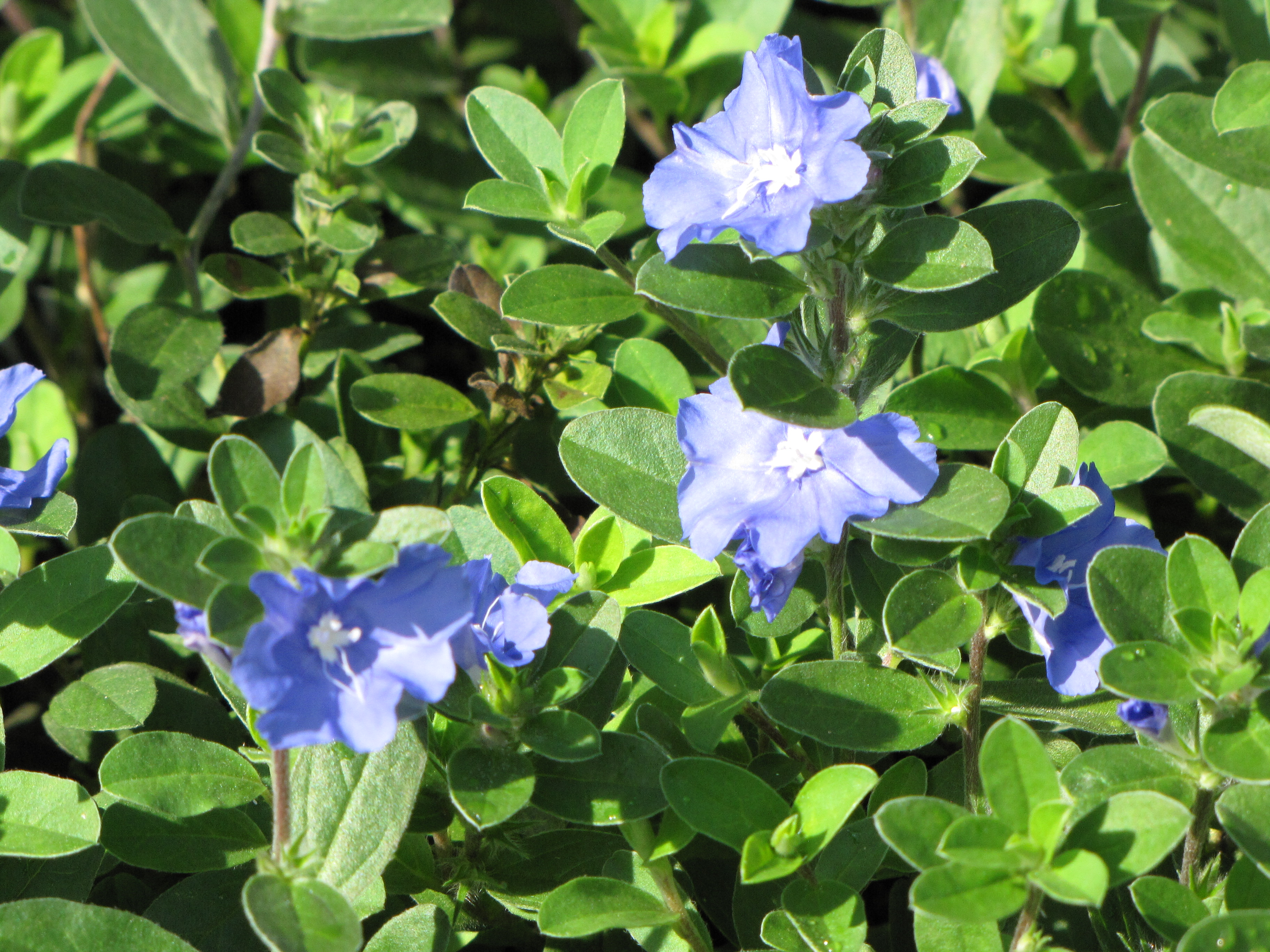
A number of flowers

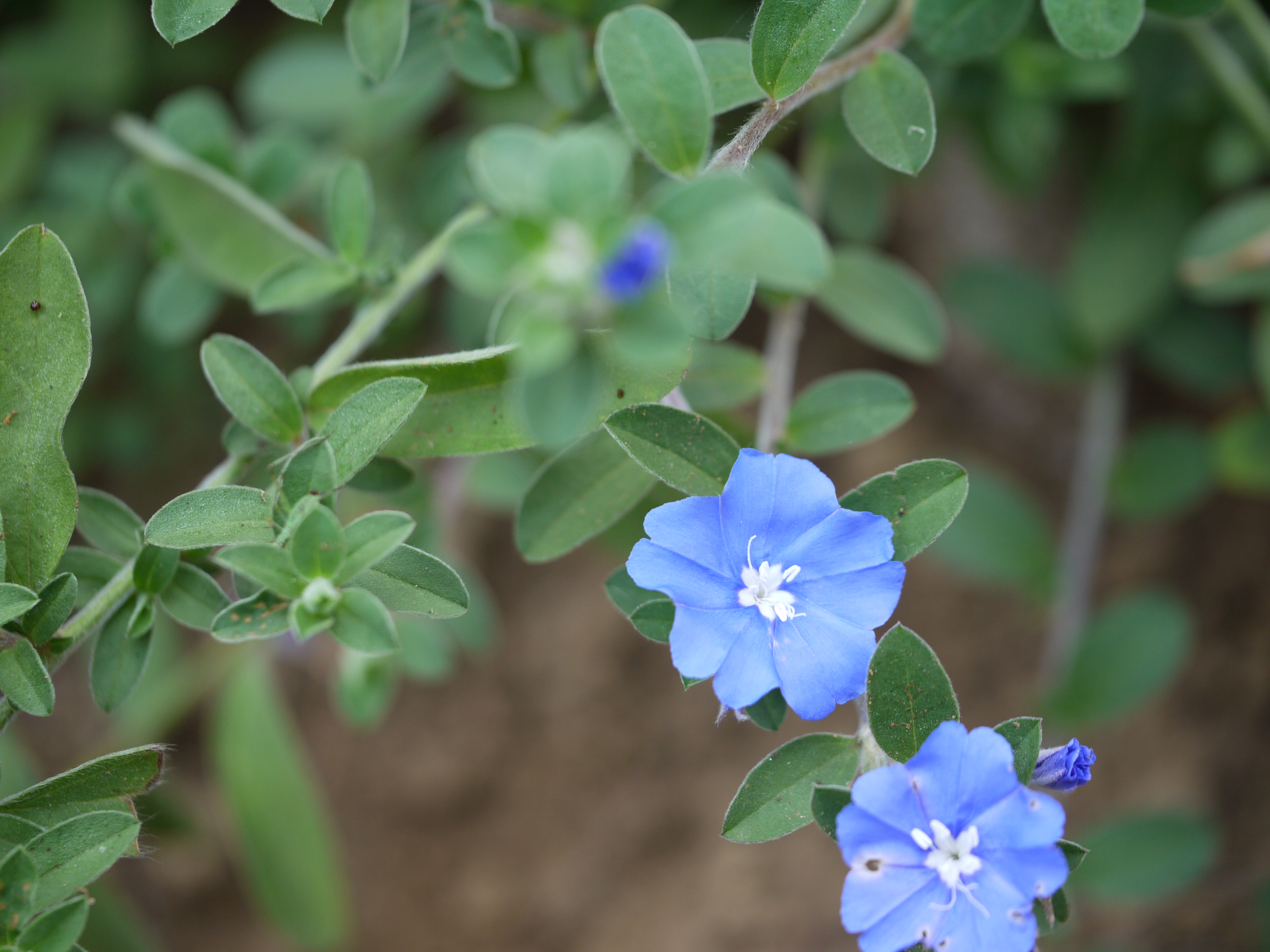
Two flowers
