= Polaribacter franzmannii =

Scientific classification
- Domain: Bacteria
- Kingdom: Pseudomonadati
- Phylum: Bacteroidota
- Class: Flavobacteriia
- Order: Flavobacteriales
- Family: Flavobacteriaceae
- Genus: Polaribacter
- Species: P. franzmannii

Binomial name
- Polaribacter franzmannii Gosink et al. 1998

Species of bacterium

Polaribacter franzmannii is a species of gas vacuolate polar marine bacteria. It was first isolated from sea ice and water from the Arctic and the Antarctic. Its type strain is ATCC 700399.
