= Mannitol 2-dehydrogenase (NADP+) =

mannitol 2-dehydrogenase (NADP^{+})

Identifiers
- EC no.: 1.1.1.138
- CAS no.: 37250-68-3

Databases
- IntEnz: IntEnz view
- BRENDA: BRENDA entry
- ExPASy: NiceZyme view
- KEGG: KEGG entry
- MetaCyc: metabolic pathway
- PRIAM: profile
- PDB structures: RCSB PDB PDBe PDBsum
- Gene Ontology: AmiGO / QuickGO
Search
- PMC: articles
- PubMed: articles
- NCBI: proteins

In enzymology, mannitol 2-dehydrogenase (NADP^{+}) (EC 1.1.1.138) is an enzyme that catalyzes the chemical reaction

mannitol
+ NADP^{+}
H^{+}
H^{+}
fructose
+ NADPH

The two substrates of this enzyme are D-mannitol and oxidised nicotinamide adenine dinucleotide phosphate (NADP^{+}). Its products are D-fructose (shown in its open-chain form), reduced NADPH, and a proton.

This enzyme belongs to the family of oxidoreductases, specifically those acting on the CH-OH group of donor with NAD^{+} or NADP^{+} as acceptor. The systematic name of this enzyme class is D-mannitol:NADP^{+} 2-oxidoreductase. This enzyme is also called mannitol 2-dehydrogenase (NADP^{+}). This enzyme participates in fructose and mannose metabolism.

== Structural studies ==
As of late 2007, only one structure has been solved for this class of enzymes, with the PDB accession code 1H5Q.
