= Mannitol dehydrogenase (cytochrome) =

Enzyme class

mannitol dehydrogenase (cytochrome)

Identifiers
- EC no.: 1.1.2.2
- CAS no.: 37250-78-5

Databases
- IntEnz: IntEnz view
- BRENDA: BRENDA entry
- ExPASy: NiceZyme view
- KEGG: KEGG entry
- MetaCyc: metabolic pathway
- PRIAM: profile
- PDB structures: RCSB PDB PDBe PDBsum
- Gene Ontology: AmiGO / QuickGO
Search
- PMC: articles
- PubMed: articles
- NCBI: proteins

In enzymology, mannitol dehydrogenase (cytochrome) (EC 1.1.2.2) is an enzyme that catalyzes the chemical reaction

Mannitol
Fe^{3+}
Fe^{2+}
Fe^{3+}
Fe^{2+}
Fructose
+ 2 H^{+}

The substrate of this enzyme is D-mannitol, which is acted on by two equivalents of the cofactor, ferricytochrome c, which oxidises one of the hydroxy groups to a keto group, giving D-fructose, while the cofactor's iron is reduced.

This enzyme belongs to the family of oxidoreductases, to be specific those acting on the CH-OH group of donor with a cytochrome as acceptor. The systematic name of this enzyme class is D-mannitol:ferricytochrome-c 2-oxidoreductase. This enzyme is also called polyol dehydrogenase. This enzyme participates in pentose and glucuronate interconversions and fructose and mannose metabolism
