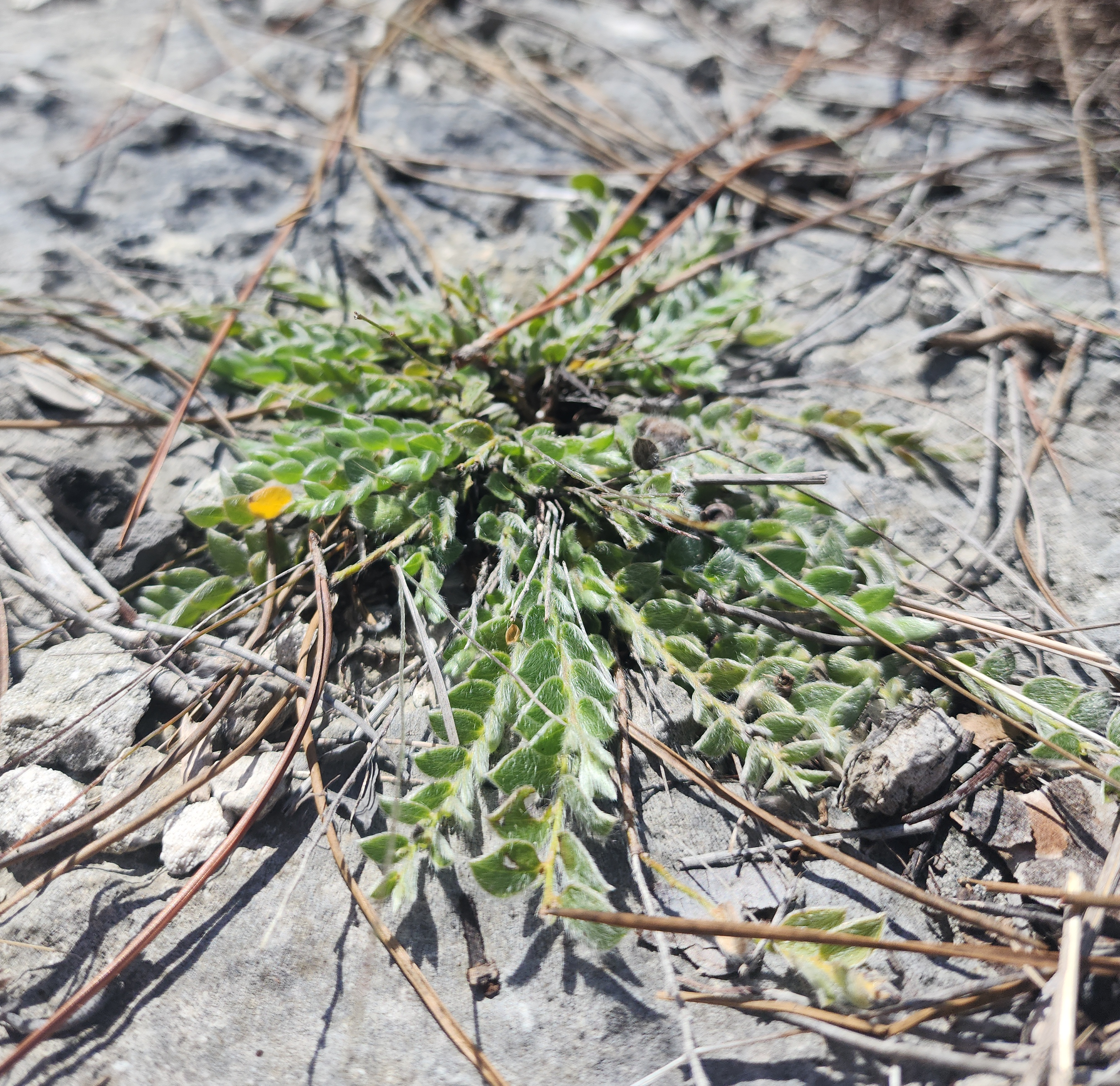
- Growing in open canopy pine rockland habitat

Conservation status
- Imperiled (NatureServe)

Scientific classification
- Kingdom: Plantae
- Clade: Tracheophytes
- Clade: Angiosperms
- Clade: Eudicots
- Clade: Asterids
- Order: Solanales
- Family: Convolvulaceae
- Genus: Evolvulus
- Species: E. grisebachii

Binomial name
- Evolvulus grisebachii Peter

= Evolvulus grisebachii =

Species of flowering plant

Evolvulus grisebachii, commonly referred to as Grisebach's dwarf morning-glory, is a rare species of flowering plant endemic extreme south Florida, western Cuba, and possibly Puerto Rico.

== Habitat ==
It is an obligate heliophyte, requiring an open canopy to persist, and is only known from pine rockland and similar calcareous habitats often found with sheer limestone exposures.

== Conservation ==
The species is threatened by habitat loss due to its restricted range and specific habitat requirements. In Florida, it is considered critically imperiled due to it only being known from one site. This relatively stable population of likely less than 1,000 plants persists on Big Pine Key where it is protected by the National Key Deer Refuge.

Outside of Florida, it is known from Cuba's Pinar del Rio Province and Isla de Juventud, where its status is presently unknown. It has also been reported from Puerto Rico, although its status there is also unknown.
