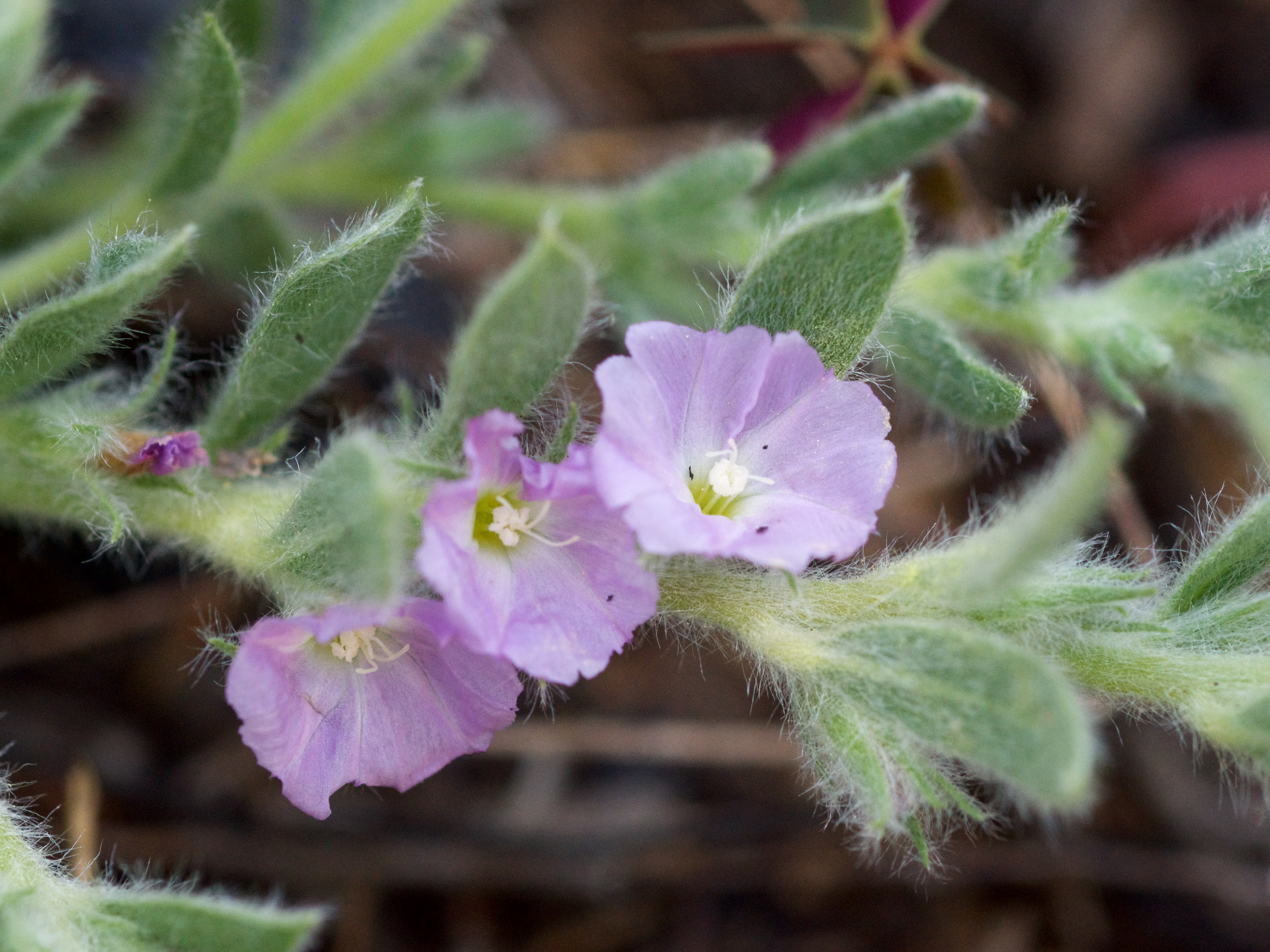
- Evolvulus nuttallianus

Scientific classification
- Kingdom: Plantae
- Clade: Tracheophytes
- Clade: Angiosperms
- Clade: Eudicots
- Clade: Asterids
- Order: Solanales
- Family: Convolvulaceae
- Tribe: Cresseae
- Genus: Evolvulus; L.

Species
- About 100, see text

= Evolvulus =

Genus of flowering plants

Evolvulus is a genus of flowering plants in the Convolvulaceae, the morning glory family. They are known generally as dwarf morning glories. Most are native to the Americas. There are about 100 species.

== Description ==
These plants are annual and perennial herbs and shrubs. They have non-twining stems. The leaves have smooth edges. Flowers are borne singly or in small clusters, or sometimes in spikes. The corolla is round and flat or bell-shaped. The fruit is a capsule containing 1 to 4 seeds.

== Taxonomy ==
=== Etymology ===
The genus name Evolvulus comes from the Latin word meaning "to unroll", inspired by its non-vining form.

=== Species ===
The following species are recognised in the genus Evolvulus:

- Evolvulus alopecuroides
- Evolvulus alsinoides - slender dwarf morning glory
- Evolvulus altissimus
- Evolvulus anagalloides
- Evolvulus arbuscula
- Evolvulus arenarius
- Evolvulus arenicola
- Evolvulus argyreus
- Evolvulus arizonicus - wild dwarf morning glory, hairy evolvulus
- Evolvulus aurigenius
- Evolvulus barbatus
- Evolvulus bogotensis
- Evolvulus boliviensis
- Evolvulus bracei House
- Evolvulus bracei (Meisn.) Ooststr.
- Evolvulus cardiophyllus
- Evolvulus chamaepitys
- Evolvulus chapadensis
- Evolvulus choapanus
- Evolvulus chrysotrichos
- Evolvulus comosus
- Evolvulus convolvuloides - bindweed dwarf morning glory
- Evolvulus cordatus
- Evolvulus corumbaensis
- Evolvulus cressoides
- Evolvulus daphnoides
- Evolvulus delicatus
- Evolvulus diosmoides
- Evolvulus elaeagnifolius
- Evolvulus elegans
- Evolvulus ericifolius
- Evolvulus fieldii
- Evolvulus filipes - Maryland dwarf morning glory
- Evolvulus flavus
- Evolvulus flexuosus
- Evolvulus frankenioides
- Evolvulus fuscus
- Evolvulus genistoides
- Evolvulus glaziovii
- Evolvulus glomeratus - Brazilian dwarf morning glory
- Evolvulus gnaphalioides
- Evolvulus goyazensis
- Evolvulus grisebachii - Grisebach's dwarf morning glory
- Evolvulus gypsophiloides
- Evolvulus hallieri
- Evolvulus harleyi
- Evolvulus hasslerianus
- Evolvulus helianthemifolius
- Evolvulus helianthemoides
- Evolvulus helichrysoides
- Evolvulus herrerae
- Evolvulus hypocrateriflorus
- Evolvulus incanus
- Evolvulus jacobinus
- Evolvulus kramerioides
- Evolvulus lagopodioides
- Evolvulus lagopus
- Evolvulus lanatus
- Evolvulus latifolius
- Evolvulus linarioides
- Evolvulus linoides
- Evolvulus lithospermoides
- Evolvulus luetzelburgii
- Evolvulus macroblepharis
- Evolvulus magnus
- Evolvulus maximiliani
- Evolvulus minimus
- Evolvulus niveus
- Evolvulus nummularius - agracejo rastrero
- Evolvulus nuttallianus - shaggy dwarf morning glory
- Evolvulus ovatus
- Evolvulus paniculatus
- Evolvulus passerinoides
- Evolvulus peruvianus
- Evolvulus phyllanthoides
- Evolvulus piurensis
- Evolvulus pohlii
- Evolvulus prostratus
- Evolvulus pterocaulon
- Evolvulus pterygophyllus
- Evolvulus purpusii
- Evolvulus pusillus
- Evolvulus rariflorus
- Evolvulus riedelii
- Evolvulus rotundifolius
- Evolvulus rufus
- Evolvulus saxifragus
- Evolvulus scoparioides
- Evolvulus sericeus - silver dwarf morning glory
- Evolvulus serpylloides
- Evolvulus siliceus
- Evolvulus simplex
- Evolvulus speciosus
- Evolvulus squamosus - rockyplains dwarf morning glory
- Evolvulus stellariifolius
- Evolvulus tenuis
- Evolvulus thymiflorus
- Evolvulus tomentosus
- Evolvulus villosissimus
- Evolvulus villosus
- Evolvulus vimineus
- Evolvulus weberbaueri

== Gallery ==
Evolvulus
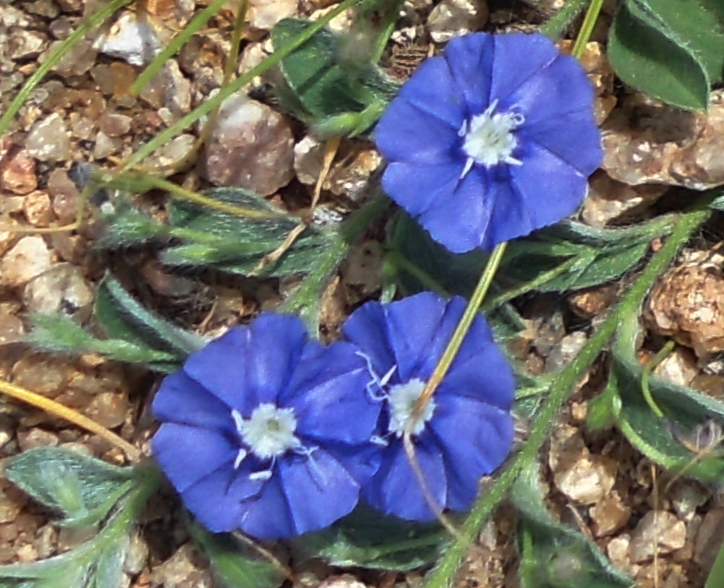
E. alsinoides

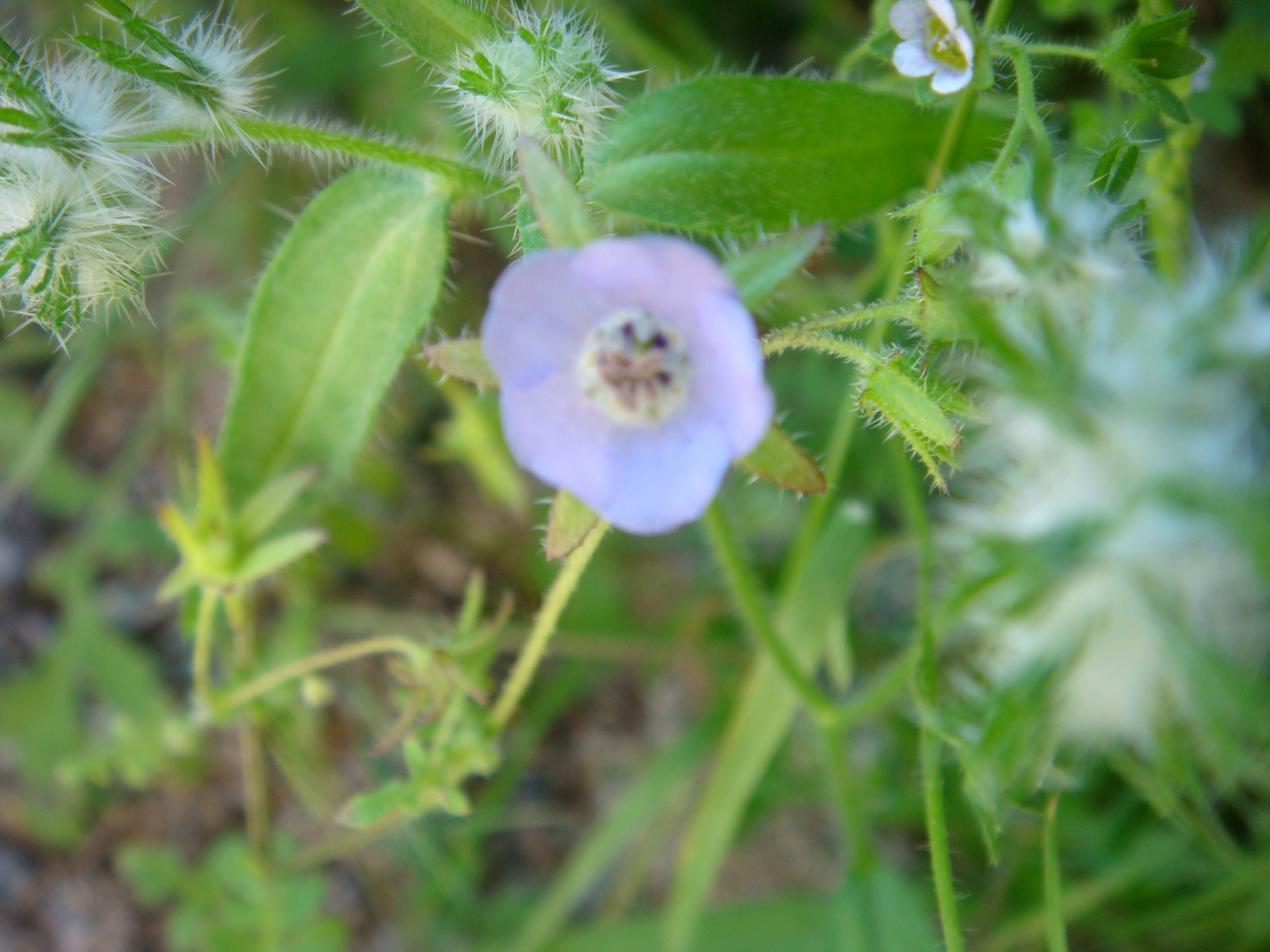
E. arizonicus

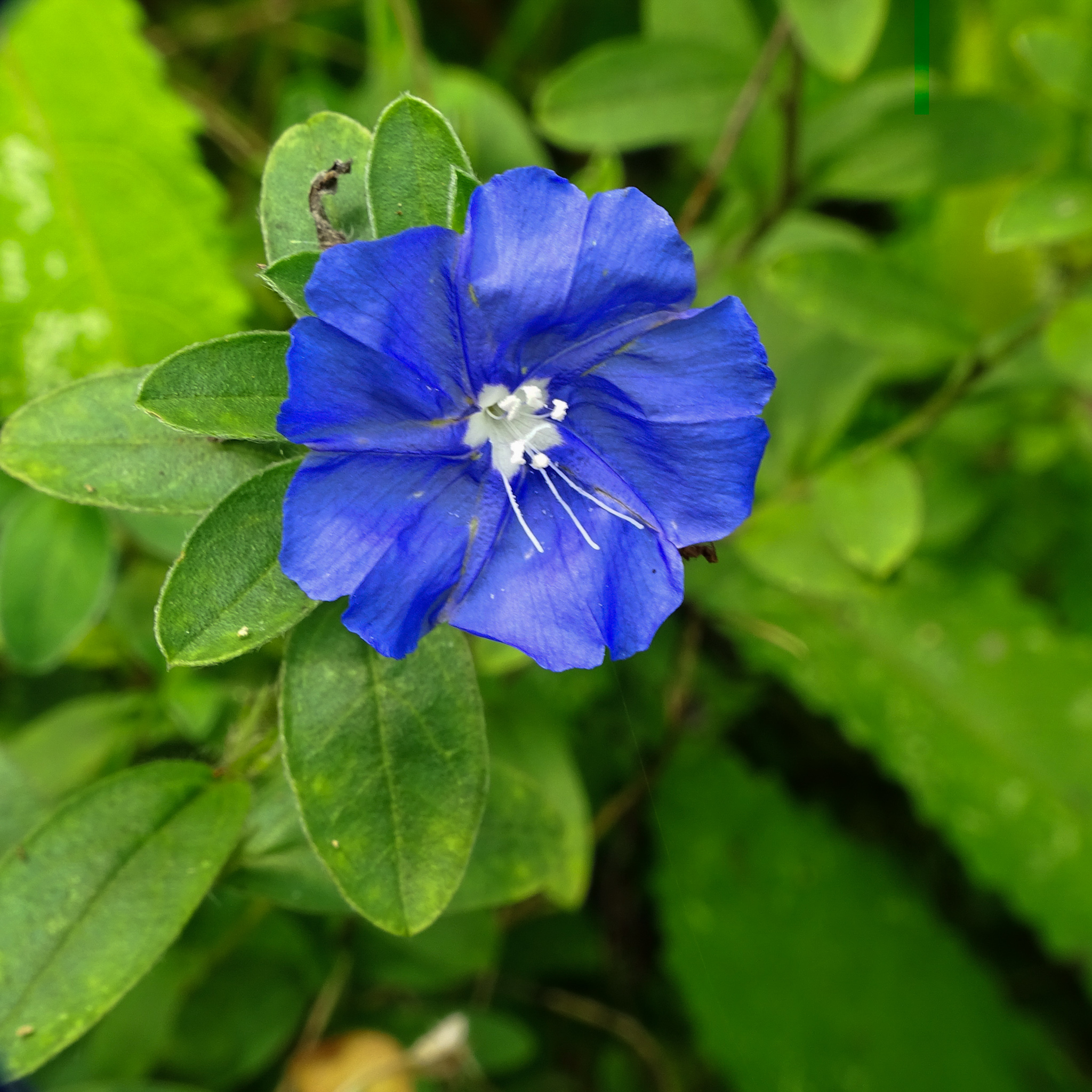
E. glomeratus

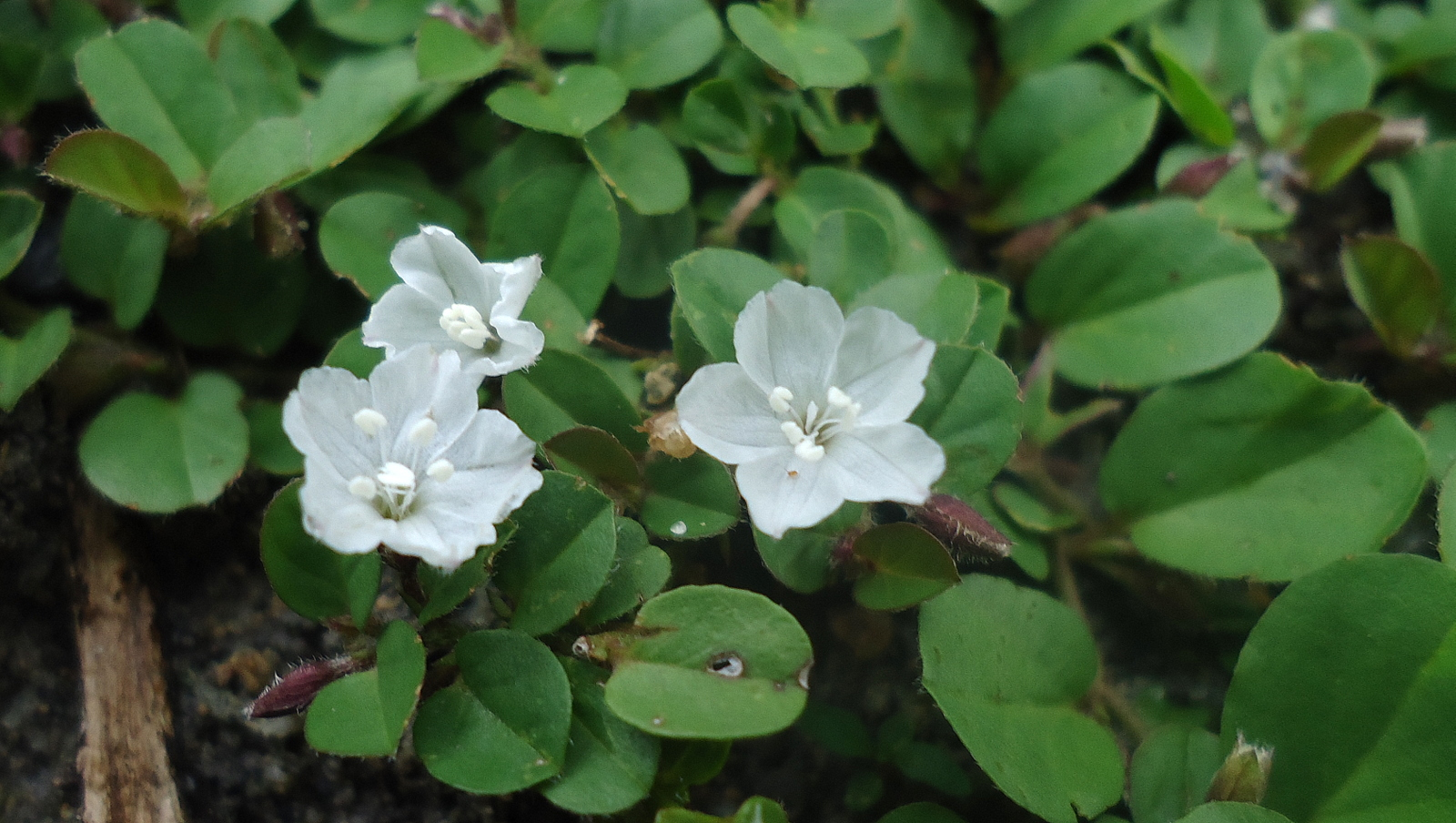
E. nummularius

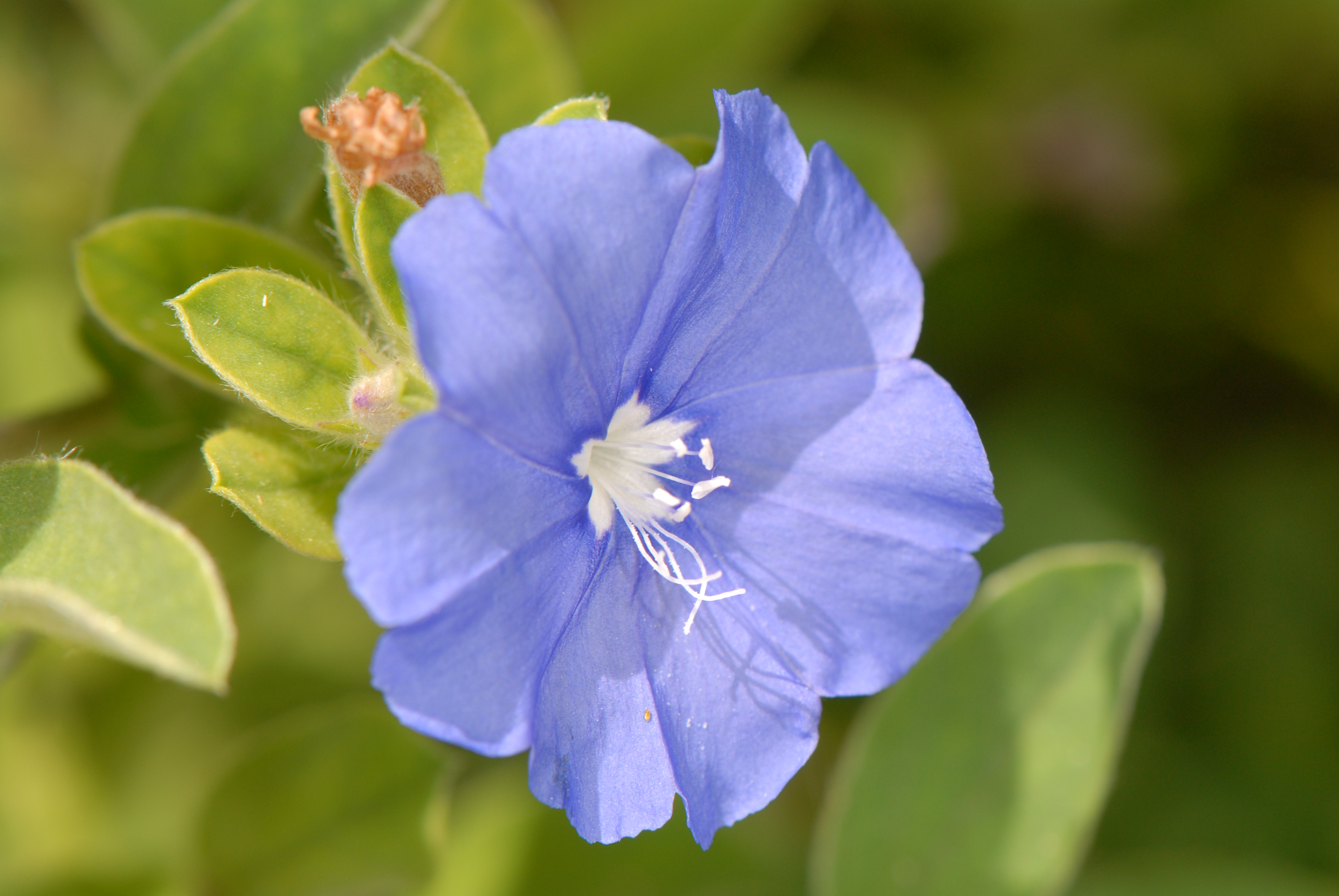
E. nuttallianus

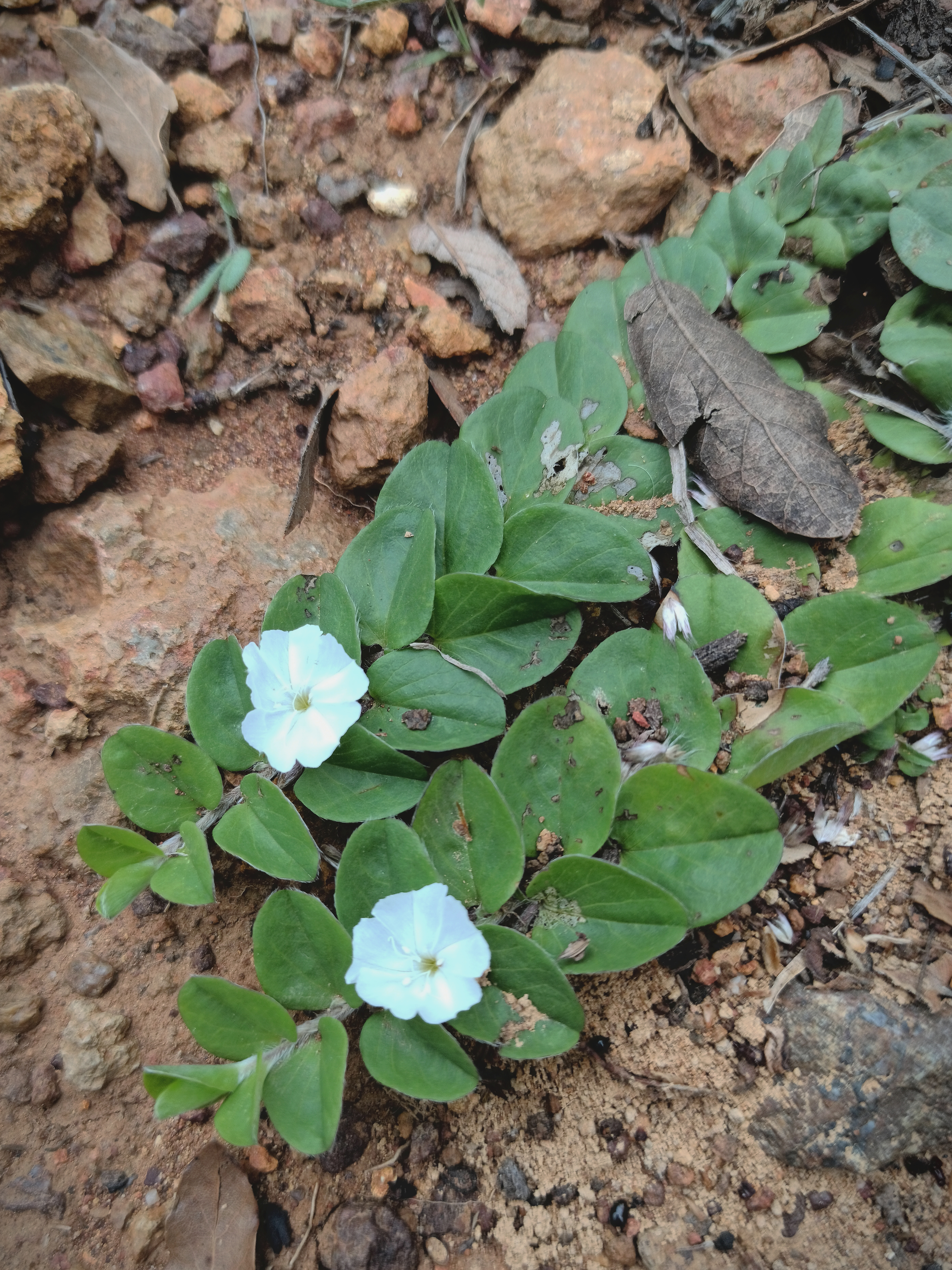
E. prostratus
