= Mannitol-1-phosphatase =

Class of enzymes

mannitol-1-phosphatase

Identifiers
- EC no.: 3.1.3.22
- CAS no.: 9055-29-2

Databases
- BRENDA: enzyme data
- ExPASy: NiceZyme view
- KEGG: enzyme entry
- MetaCyc: metabolic pathway
- Rhea: reactions
- PDB structures: RCSB PDB PDBe PDBsum
- Gene Ontology: AmiGO / QuickGO
Search
- PMC: articles
- PubMed: articles
- NCBI: proteins

The enzyme mannitol-1-phosphatase (EC 3.1.3.22) catalyzes the reaction

D-mannitol 1-phosphate
H_{2}O
P_{i}
mannitol

The enzyme characterised from Piricularia oryzae and celery hydrolyses D-mannitol 1-phosphate to mannitol and orthophosphate. In algae, mannitol produced by this reaction can represent up to 25% of their dry weight. The gene for this enzyme from Eimeria tenella has been overexpressed and used to increase mannitol production in Lactococcus lactis.

This enzyme is a hydrolase, specifically one acting on phosphoric monoester bonds. The systematic name is D-mannitol-1-phosphate phosphohydrolase. This enzyme is also called mannitol-1-phosphate phosphatase.
