= D-mannitol oxidase =

d-mannitol oxidase

Identifiers
- EC no.: 1.1.3.40

Databases
- IntEnz: IntEnz view
- BRENDA: BRENDA entry
- ExPASy: NiceZyme view
- KEGG: KEGG entry
- MetaCyc: metabolic pathway
- PRIAM: profile
- PDB structures: RCSB PDB PDBe PDBsum
- Gene Ontology: AmiGO / QuickGO
Search
- PMC: articles
- PubMed: articles
- NCBI: proteins

In enzymology, d-mannitol oxidase (EC 1.1.3.40) is an enzyme that catalyzes the chemical reaction

mannitol
O_{2}
H_{2}O_{2}
O_{2}
H_{2}O_{2}
mannose

The two substrates of this enzyme are mannitol and oxygen. Its products are D-mannose and hydrogen peroxide.

This enzyme belongs to the family of oxidoreductases, specifically those acting on the CH-OH group of donor with oxygen as acceptor. The systematic name of this enzyme class is mannitol:oxygen oxidoreductase (cyclizing). Other names in common use include mannitol oxidase, and D-arabitol oxidase.
