= Polaribacter irgensii =

Scientific classification
- Domain: Bacteria
- Kingdom: Pseudomonadati
- Phylum: Bacteroidota
- Class: Flavobacteriia
- Order: Flavobacteriales
- Family: Flavobacteriaceae
- Genus: Polaribacter
- Species: P. irgensii

Binomial name
- Polaribacter irgensii Gosink et al. 1998

Species of bacterium

Polaribacter irgensii is a species of gram-negative, gas vacuolate polar marine bacteria. The species was first isolated from sea ice and water from the Arctic and the Antarctic. Its type strain is ATCC 700398.

The species was validly published in 1998.
