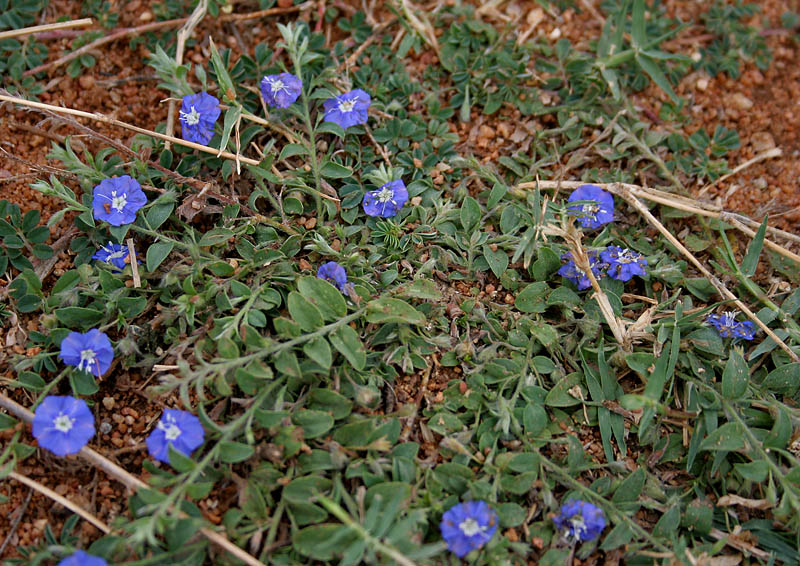

Scientific classification
- Kingdom: Plantae
- Clade: Embryophytes
- Clade: Tracheophytes
- Clade: Spermatophytes
- Clade: Angiosperms
- Clade: Eudicots
- Clade: Asterids
- Order: Solanales
- Family: Convolvulaceae
- Genus: Evolvulus
- Species: E. alsinoides

Binomial name
- Evolvulus alsinoides (L,) L.

Synonyms
- 72 synonyms: Breweria alsinoides (L.) Merr.; Convolvulus alsinoides L.; Evolvulus alsinoides var. linnaeanus Meisn.; Evolvulus alsinoides var. normalis Kuntze; Evolvulus alsinoides var. typicus Domin; Convolvulus fugacissimus Hochst. ex Choisy; Convolvulus linifolius L.; Convolvulus valerianoides Blanco; Evolvulus acapulcensis Willd. ex Schult.; Evolvulus adscendens House; Evolvulus albiflorus M.Martens & Galeotti; Evolvulus alsinoides var. acapulcensis (Willd. ex Schult.) Ooststr.; Evolvulus alsinoides var. adscendens (House) Ooststr.; Evolvulus alsinoides f. albiflorus Kuntze; Evolvulus alsinoides var. angustifolius Torr.; Evolvulus alsinoides var. argenteus (R.Br.) Domin; Evolvulus alsinoides var. choisyanus Meisn.; Evolvulus alsinoides f. coeruleus Kuntze; Evolvulus alsinoides var. debilis (Kunth) Ooststr.; Evolvulus alsinoides var. decumbens (R.Br.) Ooststr.; Evolvulus alsinoides var. erectus Schweinf.; Evolvulus alsinoides var. glaber Baker; Evolvulus alsinoides var. grisebachianus Meisn.; Evolvulus alsinoides var. hirsutus (Lam.) Ooststr.; Evolvulus alsinoides var. hirticaulis Torr.; Evolvulus alsinoides var. incanus Kuntze; Evolvulus alsinoides var. javanicus (Blume) Ooststr.; Evolvulus alsinoides f. lactiflorus Kuntze; Evolvulus alsinoides f. lactiflorus Kuntze; Evolvulus alsinoides var. linifolius (L.) Kuntze; Evolvulus alsinoides var. philippinensis Ooststr.; Evolvulus alsinoides var. procumbens Schweinf.; Evolvulus alsinoides f. rotundifolius Yamam.; Evolvulus alsinoides var. rotundifolius Hayata ex Ooststr.; Evolvulus alsinoides var. sericeus Benth.; Evolvulus alsinoides var. thymoides Hallier f.; Evolvulus alsinoides var. villosicalyx Ooststr.; Evolvulus alsinoides var. villosissimus Fenzl ex Hallier f.; Evolvulus alsinoides f. viridis Kuntze; Evolvulus alsinoides var. wallichii Ooststr.; Evolvulus angustifolius Roxb.; Evolvulus argenteus R.Br.; Evolvulus azureus Vahl ex Schumach. & Thonn.; Evolvulus boninensis F.Maek. & Tuyama; Evolvulus chinensis Choisy; Evolvulus debilis Kunth; Evolvulus decumbens R.Br.; Evolvulus diffusus Chapm.; Evolvulus filiformis Willd. ex Steud.; Evolvulus fugacissimus Hochst. ex A.Rich.; Evolvulus gracillimus Miq.; Evolvulus heterophyllus Labill.; Evolvulus hirsutulus Choisy; Evolvulus hirsutus Lam.; Evolvulus javanicus Blume; Evolvulus lanceifolius Span.; Evolvulus linifolius (L.) L.; Evolvulus linifolius var. grandiflorus Bolle; Evolvulus microphyllus M.Martens & Galeotti; Evolvulus modestus Hance; Evolvulus natalensis Sond.; Evolvulus pilosissimus M.Martens & Galeotti; Evolvulus procumbens Montrouz.; Evolvulus pseudoincanus Span.; Evolvulus pudicus Hance; Evolvulus pumilus Span.; Evolvulus ramiflorus Bojer ex Choisy; Evolvulus ramulosus M.E.Jones; Evolvulus sinicus Miq.; Evolvulus tenuis subsp. yucatanensis Ooststr.; Evolvulus villosus R.Br.; Evolvulus yemensis Deflers

= Evolvulus alsinoides =

Species of flowering plant

Evolvulus alsinoides, commonly known as dwarf morning glory and slender dwarf morning glory, is a flowering plant from the family Convolvulaceae. In Indian ayurveda, it is commonly known as Visnukranta, Vishnukranti or Shankhavel. It has a natural pantropical distribution encompassing tropical and warm-temperate regions of Australasia, Indomalaya, Polynesia, Sub-Saharan Africa and the Americas.

It was first described in 1753 by Carl Linnaeus as Convolvulus alsinoides. In 1762, he transferred it to the new genus, Evolvulus.

== Description ==
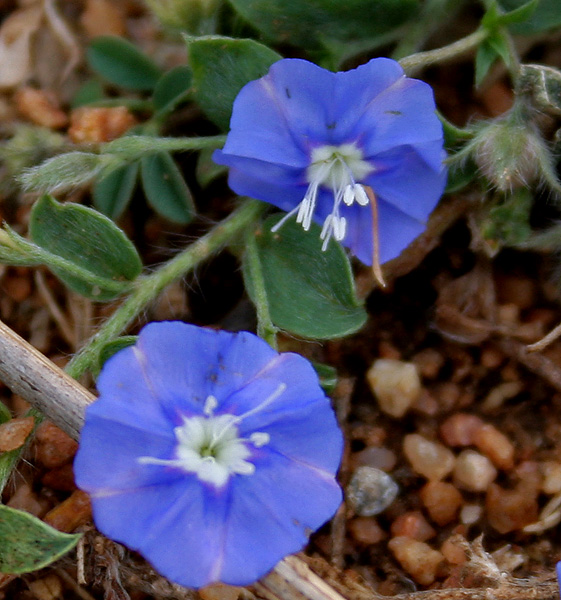
Flower detail

It is a herbaceous plant, annual or perennial with numerous prostrate or ascending stems, slender, with appressed and spreading hairs. The leaves, petiolate or subsessile, are 0.7 to 2.5 cm long and 5 to 10 mm long.

The flowers are isolated or grouped in pauciflorous cymes, borne by filiform peduncles, 2.5 to 3.5 cm long. The calyx is formed by villous, lanceolate sepals 3 to 4 mm long. The rounded corolla, with pentameric symmetry, blue in color, rarely white, is 7 to 10 mm in diameter. The stamens, with filiform filaments, are united at the base of the corolla tube. The ovary, glabrous, is surmounted by two free styles. The fruit is a globular capsule, with four valves, generally containing four seeds that are black and smooth.

== Habitat ==
The species inhabits a wide range of habitats, from marshland and wet forests to deserts. A number of varieties and subspecies are recognised. It is one of the plants included in Dasapushpam, the ten sacred flowers of Kerala.

== Chemistry ==
This herb is used in traditional medicine of East Asia for its purported psychotropic and nootropic properties, although such claims are not medically verified.

Chemical compounds isolated from E. alsinoides include scopoletin, umbelliferone, scopolin, and 2-methyl-1,2,3,4-butanetetrol.
