= Mannitol-1-phosphate 5-dehydrogenase =

mannitol-1-phosphate 5-dehydrogenase

Identifiers
- EC no.: 1.1.1.17
- CAS no.: 9028-24-4

Databases
- BRENDA: enzyme data
- ExPASy: NiceZyme view
- KEGG: enzyme entry
- MetaCyc: metabolic pathway
- Rhea: reactions
- PDB structures: RCSB PDB PDBe PDBsum
- Gene Ontology: AmiGO / QuickGO
Search
- PMC: articles
- PubMed: articles
- NCBI: proteins

Mannitol-1-phosphate 5-dehydrogenases (EC 1.1.1.17) are a type of enzyme found in bacteria and fungi that catalyze the chemical reaction

D-mannitol 1-phosphate
+ NAD^{+}
H^{+}
H^{+}
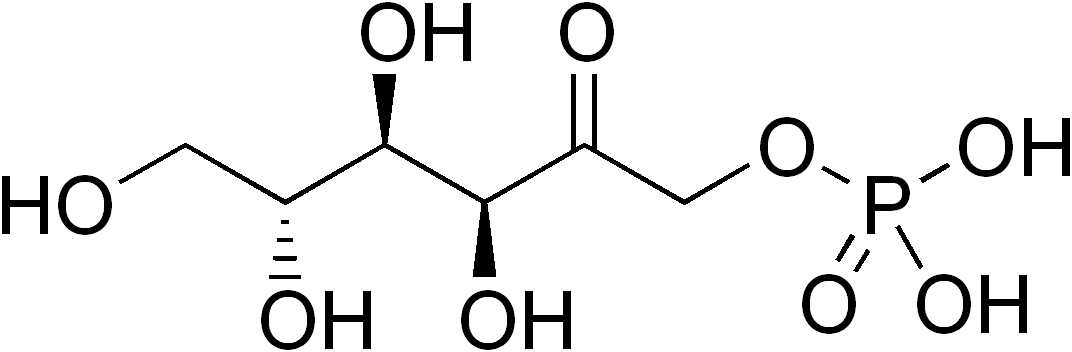
fructose 6-phosphate
+ NADH

The two substrates of this enzyme are D-mannitol 1-phosphate and oxidised nicotinamide adenine dinucleotide (NAD^{+}). Its products are fructose 6-phosphate, reduced NADH and a proton.

This enzyme belongs to the family of oxidoreductases, specifically those acting on the CH-OH group of donor with NAD^{+} or NADP^{+} as acceptor. The systematic name of this enzyme class is D-mannitol-1-phosphate:NAD^{+} 2-oxidoreductase. Other names in common use include hexose reductase, mannitol 1-phosphate dehydrogenase, D-mannitol-1-phosphate dehydrogenase, and fructose 6-phosphate reductase. This enzyme participates in fructose and mannose metabolism.

== See also ==
- D-Mannitol
