= Julije Domac =

Julije Domac (June 1st 1853, Vinkovci – March 6th 1928, Zagreb) was a Croatian pharmacist and chemist.

In 1874 Domac graduated from the University of Vienna with a degree in pharmacy. In Vienna, some of his professors were Adolf Lieben and August Emil Vogl. On the behalf of professor Lieben he went to work in the laboratory of Leopold von Pebal where he dealt with analysis of gases. In 1880 in Graz he received a doctorate degree in the field of organic chemistry. For his doctorate degree he elucidated the structure of hexene and mannitol obtained from manna. He determined the place of the double bond in hexene obtained from mannitol and proved that it is a derivative of a normal hexene. This also solved the structure of mannitol which had been unknown until then.

Although he was offered a position of assistant professor at the University of Vienna due to various circumstances Domac was forced to return to Vinkovci. After working several years as a secondary school chemistry teacher at several gymnasiums he became an associate professor and then a full professor of pharmacognosy at the Faculty of Philosophy in Zagreb, as well as a rector of University of Zagreb. In 1896 he established the Department of Pharmacognosy, one of the rare independent institutions of its type in the world at the time. He co-wrote Croato-Slavonian Pharmacopoeia, an extremely well received work among European pharmaceutical experts which introduced a number of innovations. In Croatia, an annual award (medal) for outstanding service in the field of pharmaceuticals bears his name.
