= Forage =

Plant material eaten by grazing livestock

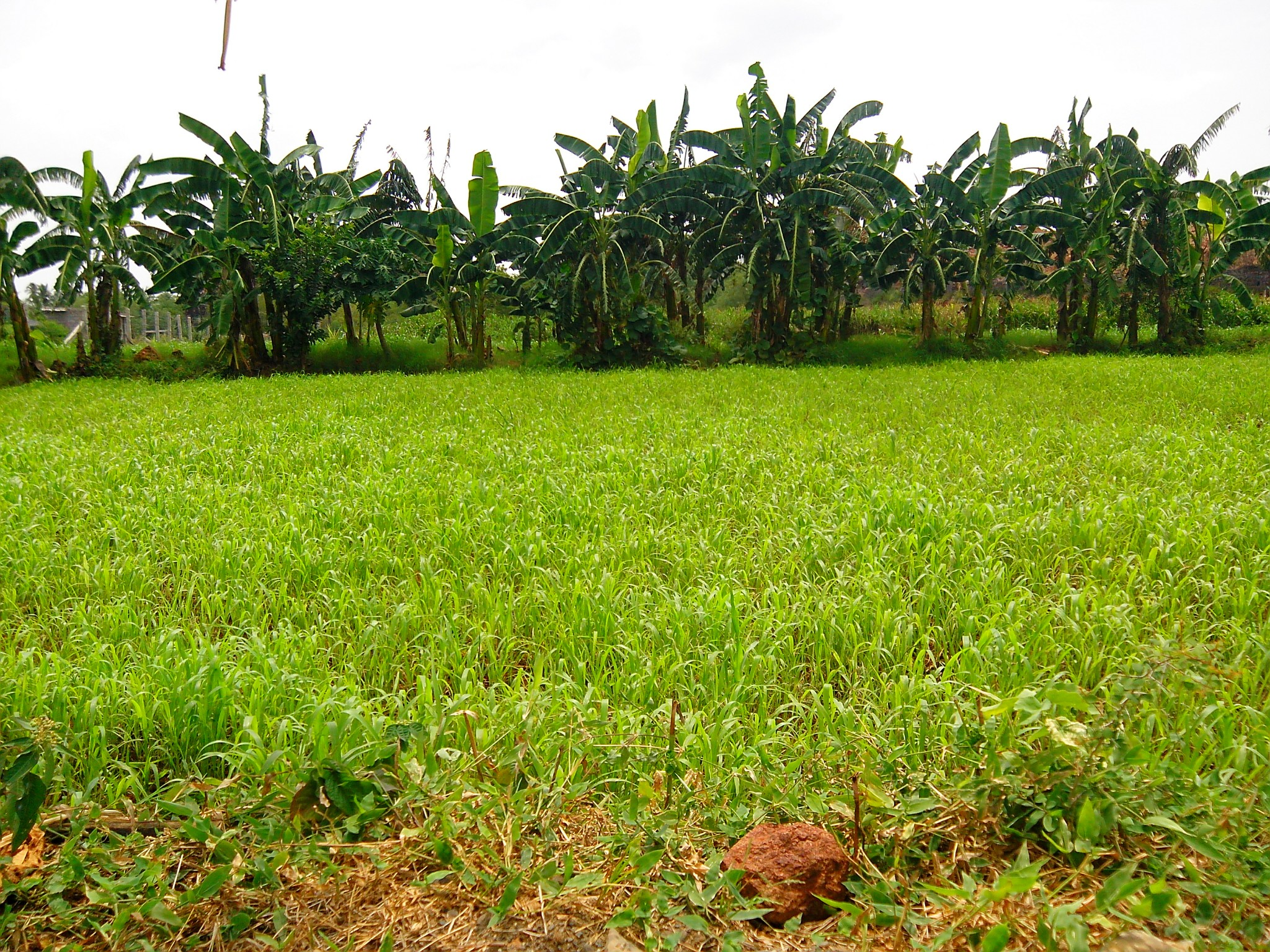
Sorghum grown as forage crop.

Forage is a plant material (mainly plant leaves and stems) eaten by grazing livestock. Historically, the term forage has meant only plants eaten by the animals directly as pasture, crop residue, or immature cereal crops, but it is also used more loosely to include similar plants cut for fodder and carried to the animals, especially as hay or silage.

While the term forage has a broad definition, the term forage crop is used to define crops, annual or biennial, which are grown to be utilized by grazing or harvesting as a whole crop.

== Common forages ==
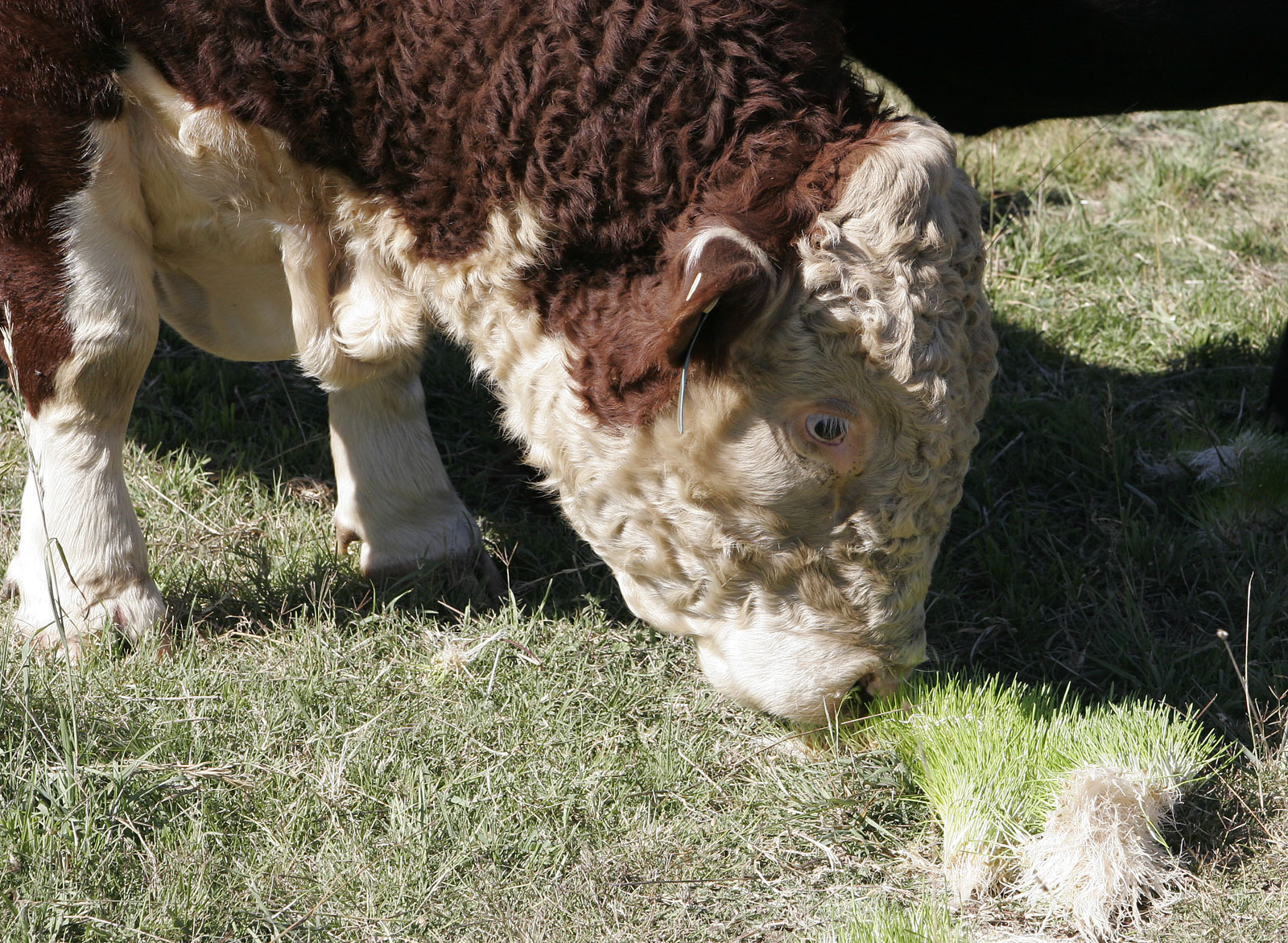
Bull feeding on grass

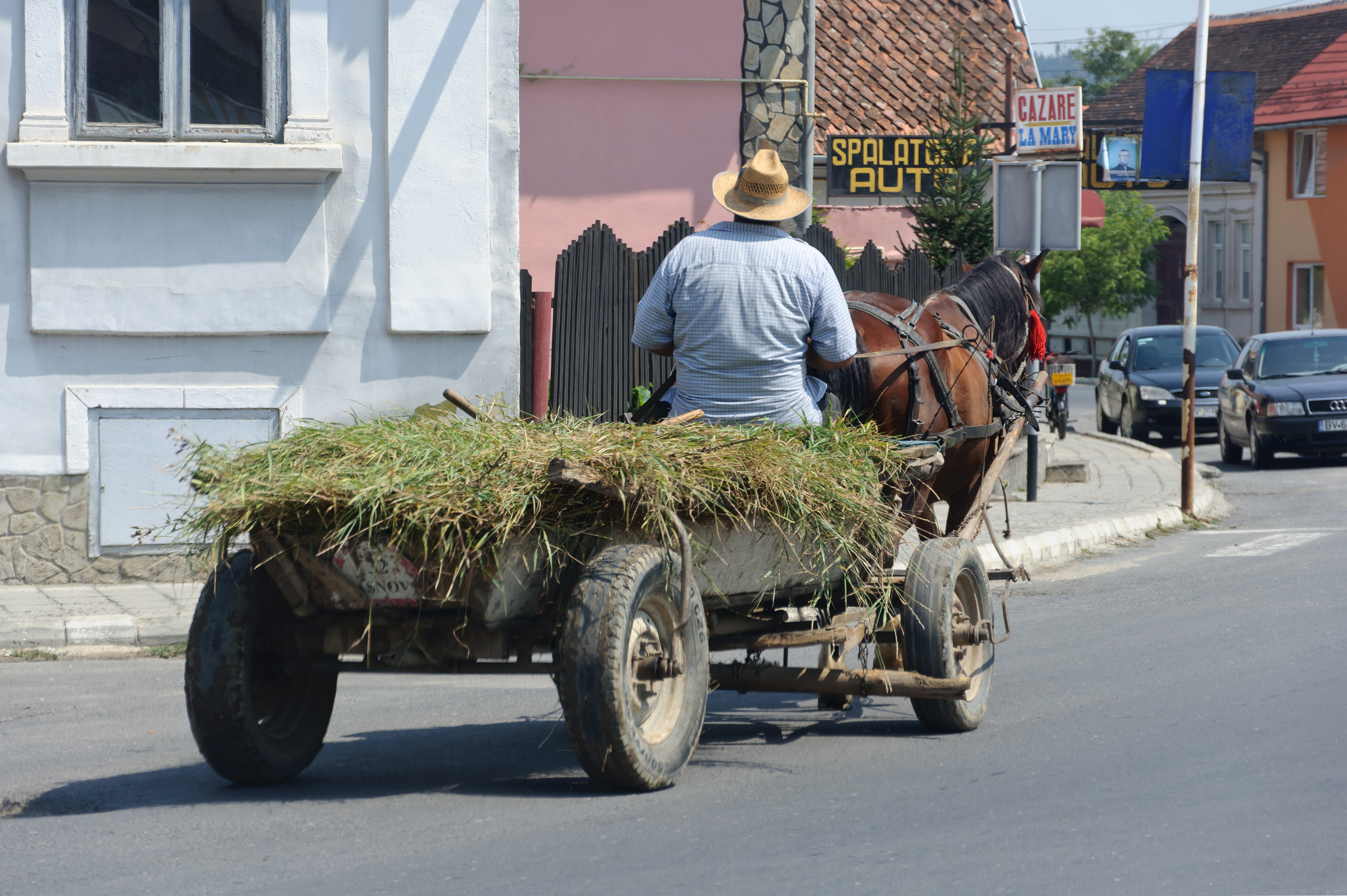
Horse-drawn transport of fodder in Romania

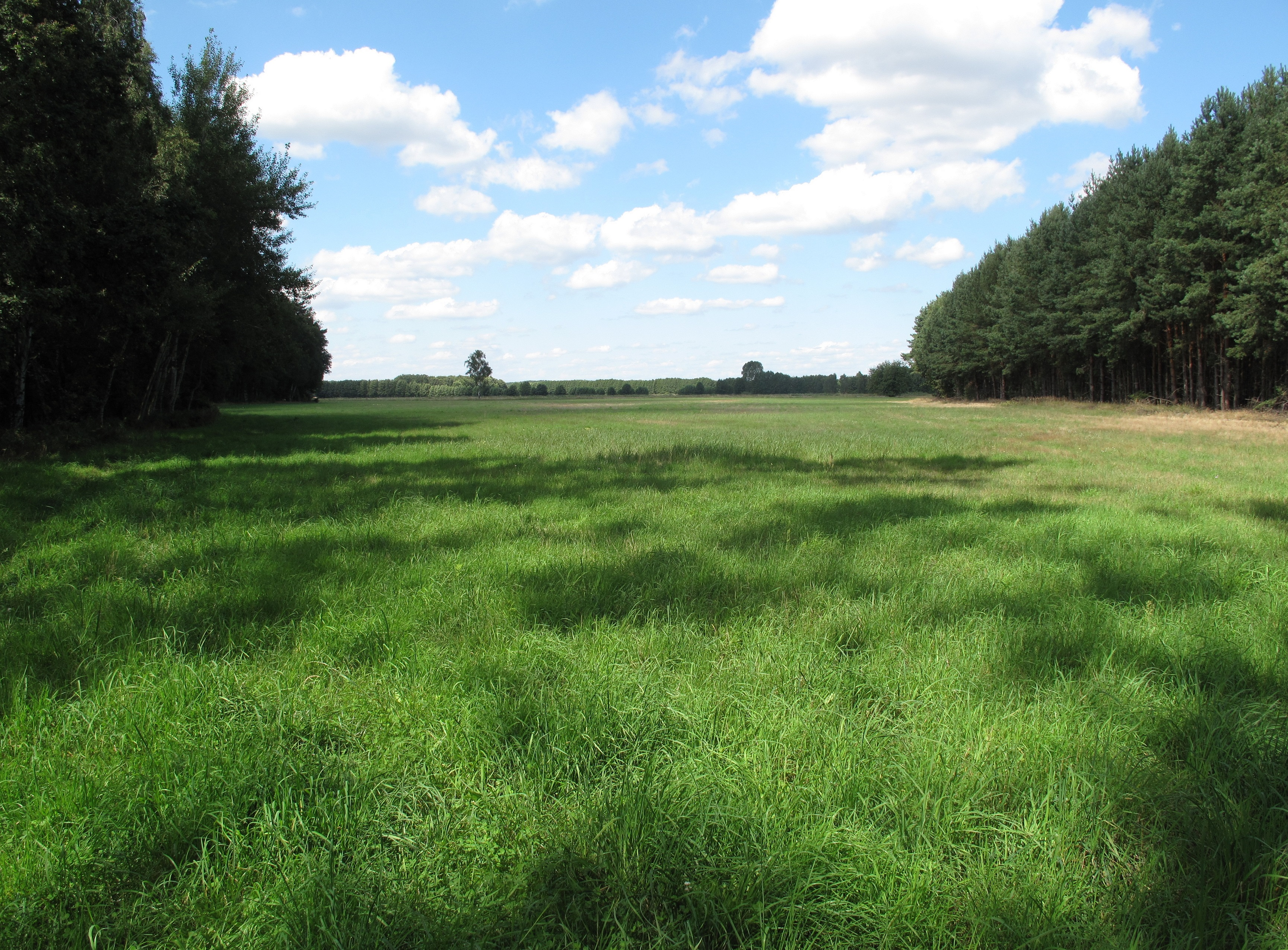
Meadow of perennial ryegrass (Lolium perenne)

=== Grasses ===
Grass forages include:

- Agrostis spp. – bentgrasses
  - Agrostis capillaris – common bentgrass
  - Agrostis stolonifera – creeping bentgrass
- Andropogon hallii – sand bluestem
- Arrhenatherum elatius – false oat-grass
- Bothriochloa bladhii – Australian bluestem
- Bothriochloa pertusa – hurricane grass
- Brachiaria decumbens – Surinam grass
- Brachiaria humidicola – koronivia grass
- Bromus spp. – bromegrasses
- Cenchrus ciliaris – buffelgrass
- Chloris gayana – Rhodes grass
- Cynodon dactylon – bermudagrass
- Dactylis glomerata – orchard grass
- Echinochloa pyramidalis – antelope grass
- Entolasia imbricata – bungoma grass
- Festuca spp. – fescues
  - Festuca arundinacea – tall fescue
  - Festuca pratensis – meadow fescue
  - Festuca rubra – red fescue
- Heteropogon contortus – black spear grass
- Hymenachne amplexicaulis – West Indian marsh grass
- Hyparrhenia rufa – jaragua
- Leersia hexandra – southern cutgrass
- Lolium spp. – ryegrasses
  - Lolium multiflorum – Italian ryegrass
  - Lolium perenne – perennial ryegrass
- Megathyrsus maximus – Guinea grass
- Melinis minutiflora – molasses grass
- Paspalum conjugatum – carabao grass
- Paspalum dilatatum – dallisgrass
- Phalaris arundinacea – reed canarygrass
- Phleum pratense – timothy
- Poa spp. – bluegrasses, meadow-grasses
  - Poa arachnifera – Texas bluegrass
  - Poa pratensis – Kentucky bluegrass
  - Poa trivialis – rough bluegrass
- Setaria sphacelata – African bristlegrass
- Themeda triandra – kangaroo grass
- Thinopyrum intermedium – intermediate wheatgrass

=== Herbaceous legumes ===
Herbaceous legume forages include:

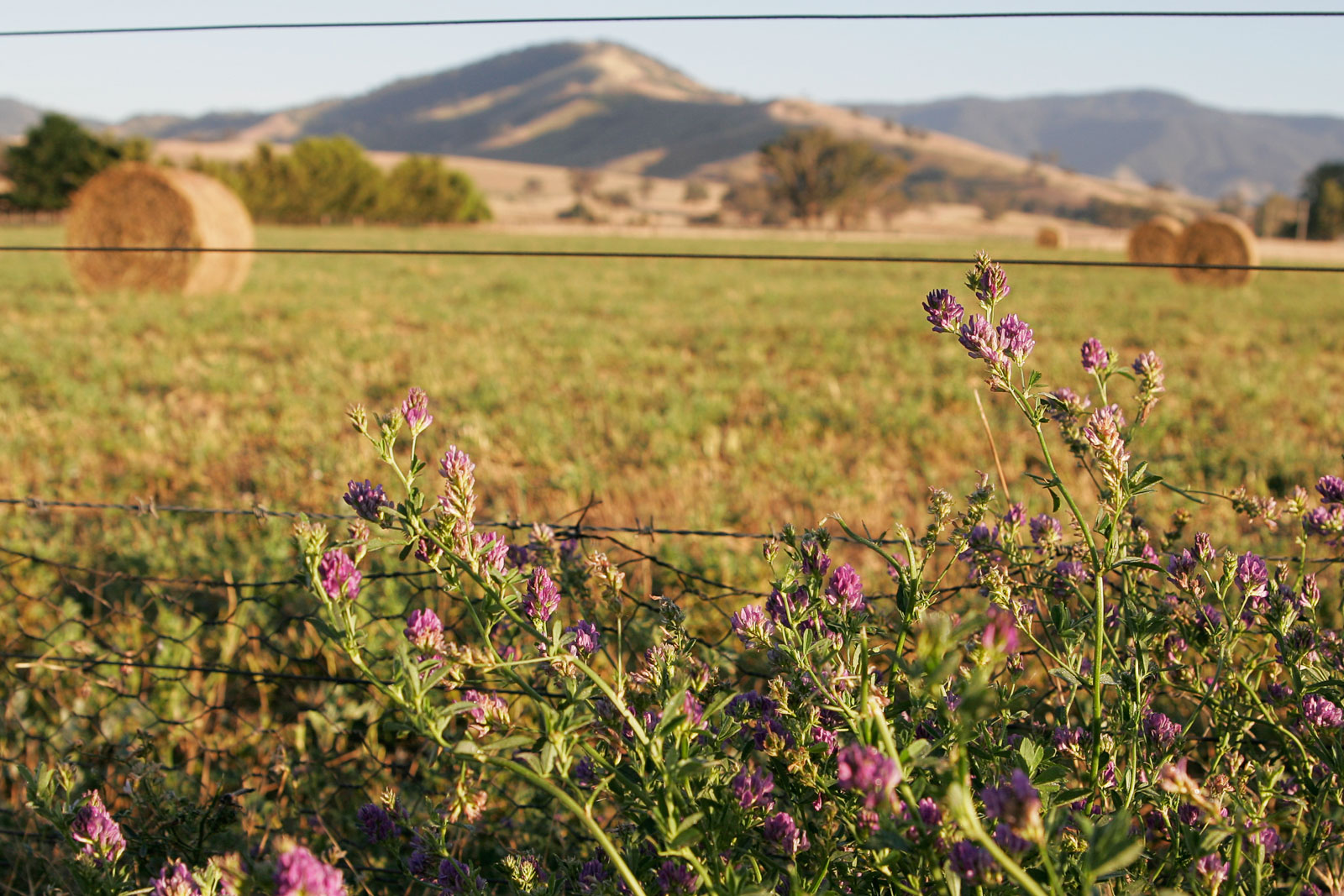
Alfalfa

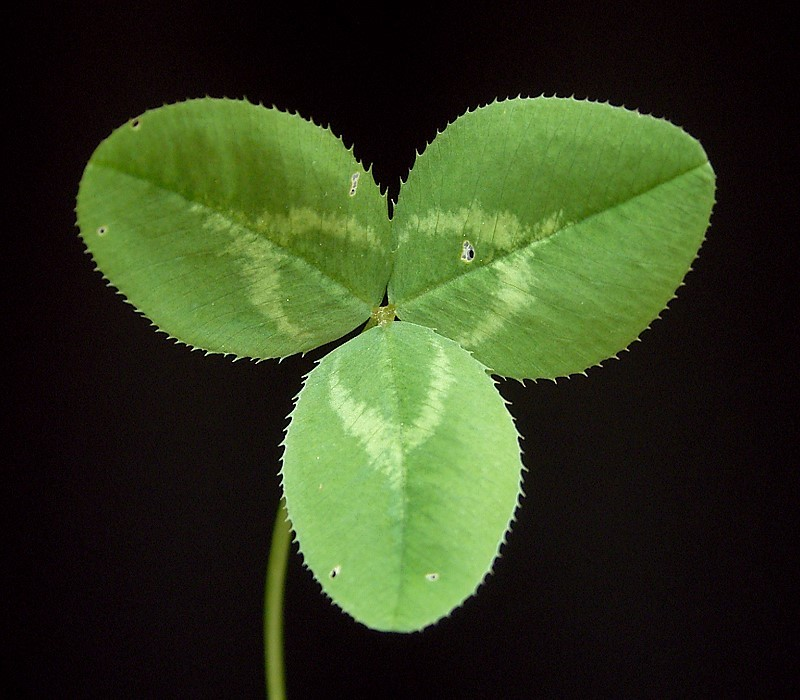
White clover (Trifolium repens)

- Arachis pintoi – pinto peanut
- Astragalus cicer – cicer milkvetch
- Chamaecrista rotundifolia – roundleaf sensitive pea
- Clitoria ternatea – butterfly-pea
- Kummerowia – annual lespedezas
  - Kummerowia stipulacea – Korean clover, Korean lespedeza
  - Kummerowia striata – Japanese clover, common lespedeza
- Lotus corniculatus – bird's-foot trefoil
- Macroptilium atropurpureum – purple bush-bean
- Macroptilium bracteatum – burgundy bean
- Medicago spp. – medics
  - Medicago sativa – alfalfa, lucerne
  - Medicago truncatula – barrel medic
- Melilotus spp. – sweetclovers
- Neonotonia wightii – perennial soybean
- Onobrychis viciifolia – common sainfoin
- Stylosanthes spp. – stylo
  - Stylosanthes humilis – Townsville stylo
  - Stylosanthes scabra – shrubby stylo
- Trifolium spp. – clovers
  - Trifolium hybridum – alsike clover
  - Trifolium incarnatum – crimson clover
  - Trifolium pratense – red clover
  - Trifolium repens – white clover
- Vicia spp. – vetches
  - Vicia articulata – oneflower vetch
  - Vicia ervilia – bitter vetch
  - Vicia narbonensis – narbon vetch
  - Vicia sativa – common vetch, tare
  - Vicia villosa – hairy vetch
- Vigna parkeri – creeping vigna

=== Tree legumes ===
Tree legume forages include:

- Acacia aneura – mulga
- Albizia spp. – silk trees
- Albizia canescens – Belmont siris
- Albizia lebbeck – lebbeck
- Enterolobium cyclocarpum – earpodtree
- Leucaena leucocephala – leadtree

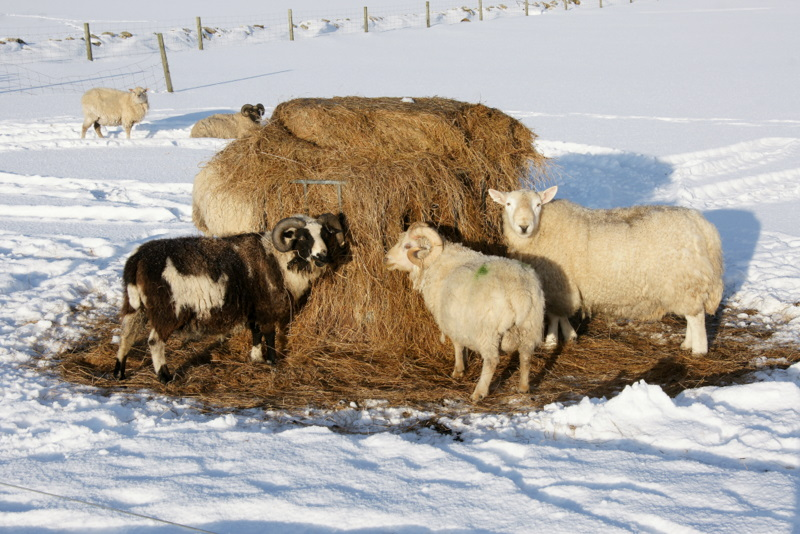
Sheep with silage

=== Silage ===
Silage may be composed by the following:

- Alfalfa
- Maize (corn)
- Grass-legume mix
- Sorghums
- Oats

=== Aquatic feeds ===
- Lemna minor – Duckweed
- Pistia stratiotes – Water lettuce
- Eichhornia crassipes – Water hyacinth
- Salvinia molesta – fern
- Ipomoea aquatica – Water spinach

=== Crop residue ===
Crop residues used as forage include:

- Sorghum
- Sweet potato vines
- Corn or soybean
- Fruit tree by-products stover
- Daikon raddish

== Other ==
- Raphanus sativus var. longipinnatus – Daikon radish/"forage radish"

== See also ==
- Grass-fed beef
- Forage fish – Small prey fish
