= Seed dormancy =

Adaptive mechanism in plants

Seed dormancy is an evolutionary adaptation that prevents seeds from germinating during unsuitable ecological conditions that would typically lead to a low probability of seedling survival. Dormant seeds do not germinate in a specified period of time under a combination of environmental factors that are normally conducive to the germination of non-dormant seeds.

An important function of seed dormancy is delayed germination, which allows dispersal and prevents simultaneous germination of all seeds. The staggering of germination safeguards some seeds and seedlings from suffering damage or death from short periods of bad weather or from transient herbivores; it also allows some seeds to germinate when competition from other plants for light and water might be less intense. Another form of delayed seed germination is seed quiescence, which is different from true seed dormancy and occurs when a seed fails to germinate because the external environmental conditions are too dry or warm or cold for germination.

Many species of plants have seeds that delay germination for many months or years, and some seeds can remain in the soil seed bank for more than 50 years before germination. Seed dormancy is especially adaptive in fire-prone ecosystems. Some seeds have a very long viability period, and the oldest documented germinating seed was nearly 2000 years old based on radiocarbon dating.

== Overview ==
True dormancy or inherent (or innate) dormancy is caused by conditions within the seed that prevent germination even if the conditions are favorable. Imposed dormancy is caused by the external conditions that remain unsuitable for germination Seed dormancy can be divided into two major categories based on what part of the seed produces dormancy: exogenous and endogenous. There are three types of inherent dormancy based on their mode of action: physiological, morphological, and physical.

There have been a number of classification schemes developed to group different dormant seeds, but none have gained universal usage. Dormancy occurs because of a wide range of reasons that often overlap, producing conditions in which definitive categorization is not clear. Compounding this problem is that the same seed that is dormant for one reason at a given point may be dormant for another reason at a later point. Some seeds fluctuate from periods of dormancy to non dormancy, and despite the fact that a dormant seed appears to be static or inert, in reality they are still receiving and responding to environmental cues.

Not all seeds undergo a period of dormancy, many species of plants release their seeds late in the year when the soil temperature is too low for germination or when the environment is dry. If these seeds are collected and sown in an environment that is warm enough, and/or moist enough, they will germinate. Under natural conditions non dormant seeds released late in the growing season wait until spring when the soil temperature rises or in the case of seeds dispersed during dry periods until it rains and there is enough soil moisture.

Seeds that do not germinate because they have fleshy fruits that retard germination are quiescent, not dormant.

Many garden plants have seeds that will germinate readily as soon as they have water and are warm enough, though their wild ancestors had dormancy. These cultivated plants lack seed dormancy because of generations of selective pressure by plant breeders and gardeners that grew and kept plants that lacked dormancy.

Seeds of some mangroves are viviparous and begin to germinate while still attached to the parent; they produce a large, heavy root, which allows the seed to penetrate into the ground when it falls. Viviparous germination is an adaptation of mangroves for saline environment.

== Exogenous dormancy ==
Exogenous dormancy is caused by conditions outside the embryo and is often broken down into three subgroups:

=== Physical dormancy ===
Dormancy caused by an impermeable seed coat is known as physical dormancy. Physical dormancy is the result of impermeable layer(s) that develops during maturation and drying of the seed or fruit. This impermeable layer prevents the seed from taking up water or gases. As a result, the seed is prevented from germinating until dormancy is broken. In natural systems, physical dormancy is broken by several factors including high temperatures, fluctuating temperatures, fire, freezing/thawing, drying or passage through the digestive tracts of animals. Physical dormancy is believed to have developed more than 100 million years ago.

Once physical dormancy is broken it cannot be reinstated (i.e. the seed is unable to enter secondary dormancy following unfavourable conditions unlike seeds with physiological dormancy mechanisms). Therefore, the timing of the mechanisms that breaks physical dormancy is critical and must be tuned to environmental cues. This maximises the chances for germination occurring in conditions where the plant will successfully germinate, establish and eventually reproduce.

Physical dormancy has been identified in the seeds of plants across 16 angiosperm families including:

- Anacardiaceae
- Asteraceae
- Bixaceae
- Cannaceae (monocot)
- Cistaceae
- Cochlospermaceae
- Convolvulaceae
- Cucurbitaceae
- Dipterocarpaceae
- Geraniaceae
- Fabaceae
- Malvaceae
- Nelumbonaceae
- Rhamnaceae
- Sarcolaenaceae
- Sapindaceae

Physical dormancy has been recorded in a few species of Cycadales with thick sclerotesta and slow embryo development, for example Cycas revoluta and Zamia floridana, but not in any of the other groups of extant gymnosperms.

Generally, physical dormancy is the result of one or more palisade layers in the fruit or seed coat. These layers are lignified with malpighian cells tightly packed together and impregnated with water-repellent. In the families Anacardiaceae and Nelumbonaceae the seed coat is not well developed. Therefore, palisade layers in the fruit perform the functional role of preventing water uptake . While physical dormancy is a common feature, several species in these families do not have physical dormancy or produce non-dormant seeds.

Specialised structures, which function as a "water-gap", are associated with the impermeable layers of the seed to prevent the uptake of water. The water-gap is closed at seed maturity and is opened in response to the appropriate environmental signal. Breaking physical dormancy involves the disruption of these specialised structures within the seed, and acts as an environmental signal detector for germination. For example, legume (Fabaceae) seeds become permeable after the thin-walled cells of lens (water-gap structure) are disrupted and pull apart to allow water to contact the seed. Other water-gap structures include carpellary micropyle, bixoid chalazal plug, imbibition lid and the suberised "stopper".

In nature, the seed coats of physically dormant seeds are thought to become water permeable over time through repeated heating and cooling over many months or years in the soil seedbank. For example, the high and fluctuating temperatures during the dry season in northern Australia promote dormancy break in impermeable seeds of Stylosanthes humilis and S.hamata (Fabaceae).

Generally, the weight of physically dormant seeds (e.g., Abrus precatorious) remains relatively constant over long periods of time, even under different environmental conditions (moisture, temperature) due to the impermeability of seed coat towards water and air. Indigenous people recognizing that the weight of Abrus precatorious seeds remains stable have used them as a weighing unit (Ratti).

=== Mechanical dormancy ===
Mechanical dormancy is when seed coats or other coverings are too hard to allow the embryo to expand during germination. In the past this mechanism of dormancy was ascribed to a number of species that have been found to have endogenous factors for their dormancy instead. These endogenous factors include low embryo growth potential.

=== Chemical dormancy ===
Includes growth regulators etc., that are present in the coverings around the embryo. They may be leached out of the tissues by washing or soaking the seed, or deactivated by other means. Other chemicals that prevent germination are washed out of the seeds by rainwater or snow melt.

== Endogenous dormancy ==
Endogenous dormancy is caused by conditions within the embryo itself, and it is also often broken down into three subgroups: physiological dormancy, morphological dormancy and combined dormancy, each of these groups may also have subgroups.

=== Physiological dormancy ===
Physiological dormancy prevents embryo growth and seed germination until chemical changes occur. Physiological dormancy is indicated when an increase in germination rate occurs after an application of gibberellic acid (GA3) or after Dry after-ripening or dry storage. It is also indicated when dormant seed embryos are excised and produce healthy seedlings: or when up to 3 months of cold (0–10 °C) or warm (=15 °C) stratification increases germination: or when dry after-ripening shortens the cold stratification period required. In some seeds physiological dormancy is indicated when scarification increases germination.

Physiological dormancy is broken when inhibiting chemicals are broken down or are no longer produced by the seed; often by a period of cool moist conditions, normally below (+4C) 39F, or in the case of many species in Ranunculaceae and a few others,(−5C) 24F. Abscisic acid is usually the growth inhibitor in seeds and its production can be affected by light. Some plants like Peony species have multiple types of physiological dormancy, one affects radicle (root) growth while the other affects plumule (shoot) growth.

- Drying; some plants including a number of grasses and those from seasonally arid regions need a period of drying before they will germinate, the seeds are released but need to have a lower moisture content before germination can begin. If the seeds remain moist after dispersal, germination can be delayed for many months or even years. Many herbaceous plants from temperate climate zones have physiological dormancy that disappears with drying of the seeds.
- Photodormancy or light sensitivity affects germination of some seeds. These photoblastic seeds need a period of darkness or light to germinate. In species with thin seed coats, light may be able to penetrate into the dormant embryo. The presence of light or the absence of light may trigger the germination process, inhibiting germination in some seeds buried too deeply or in others not buried in the soil.
- Thermodormancy is seed sensitivity to heat or cold. Some seeds including cocklebur and amaranth germinate only at high temperatures (30C or 86F). Many plants that have seeds that germinate in early to mid summer have thermodormancy and germinate only when the soil temperature is warm. Other seeds need cool soils to germinate, while others like celery are inhibited when soil temperatures are too warm. Often thermodormancy requirements disappear as the seed ages or dries.

Seeds are classified as having deep physiological dormancy under these conditions: applications of GA3 does not increase germination; or when excised embryos produce abnormal seedlings; or when seeds require more than 3 months of cold stratification to germinate.

=== Morphological dormancy ===
In morphological dormancy, the embryo is underdeveloped or undifferentiated. Some seeds have fully differentiated embryos that need to grow more before seed germination, or the embryos are not differentiated into different tissues at the time of fruit ripening.

- Immature embryos – some plants release their seeds before the tissues of the embryos have fully differentiated, and the seeds ripen after they take in water while on the ground, germination can be delayed from a few weeks to a few months.

=== Combined dormancy ===
These seeds have both morphological and physiological dormancy.

- Morpho-physiological or morphophysiological dormancy occurs when seeds with underdeveloped embryos, also have physiological components to dormancy. These seeds therefore require dormancy-breaking treatments as well as a period of time to develop fully grown embryos.
- Intermediate simple
- Deep simple
- Deep simple epicotyl
- Deep simple double
- Intermediate complex
- Deep complex

== Combinational dormancy ==
Combinational dormancy occurs in some seeds, where dormancy is caused by both exogenous (physical) and endogenous (physiological) conditions. Some Iris species have both hard impermeable seeds coats and physiological dormancy.

== Secondary dormancy ==
Secondary dormancy occurs in some non-dormant and post dormant seeds that are exposed to conditions that are not favorable for germination, like high temperatures. It is caused by conditions that occur after the seed has been dispersed. The mechanisms of secondary dormancy are not yet fully understood but might involve the loss of sensitivity in receptors in the plasma membrane.
