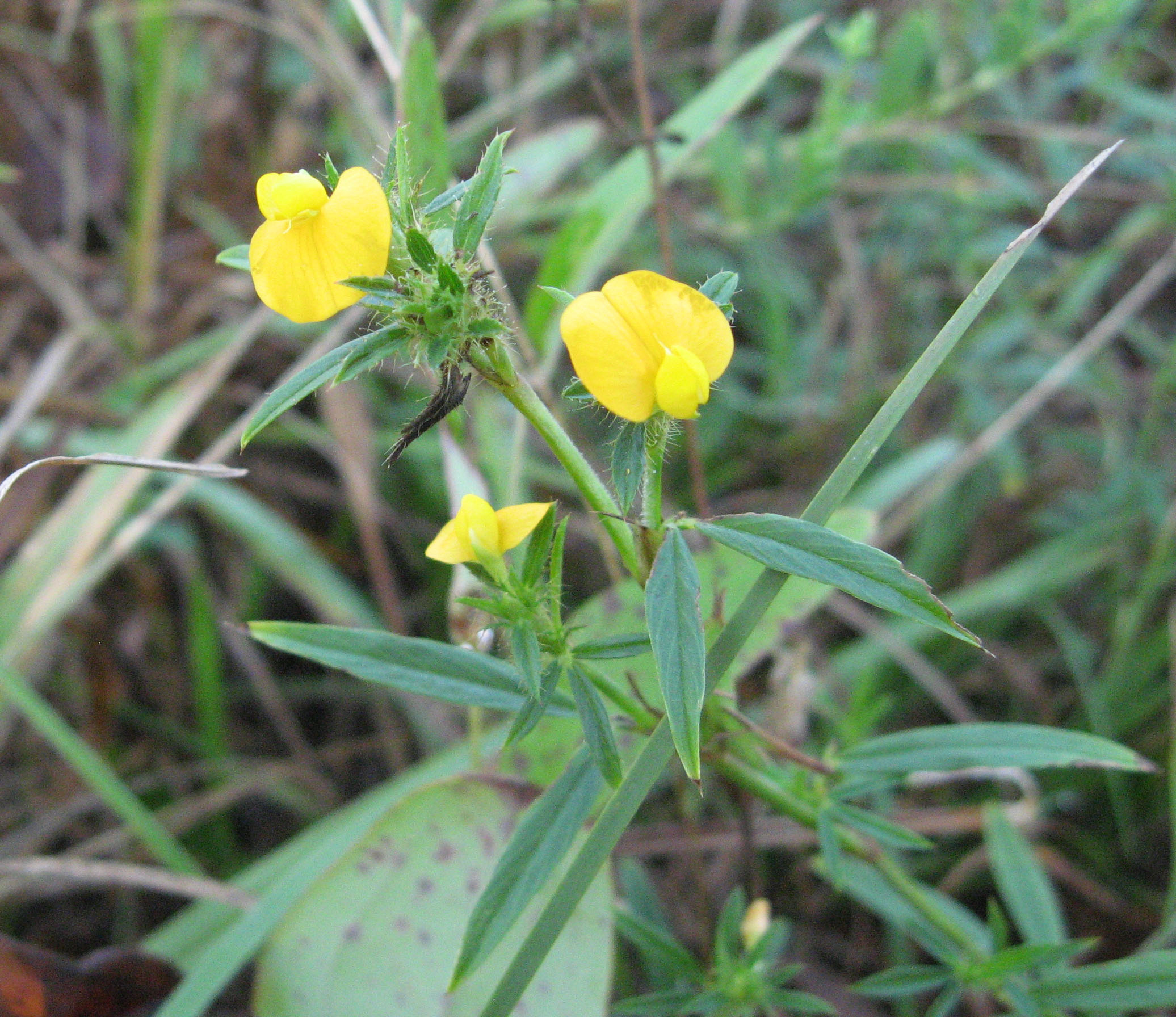

Conservation status
- Secure (NatureServe)

Scientific classification
- Kingdom: Plantae
- Clade: Tracheophytes
- Clade: Angiosperms
- Clade: Eudicots
- Clade: Rosids
- Order: Fabales
- Family: Fabaceae
- Subfamily: Faboideae
- Genus: Stylosanthes
- Species: S. biflora

Binomial name
- Stylosanthes biflora (L.) Britton, Sterns & Poggenb.

= Stylosanthes biflora =

Species of legume

Stylosanthes biflora, known by the common names pencil flower, sidebeak pencilflower, and endbeak pencilflower, is a species of flowering plant in the Fabaceae (legume) family. It is native to the Southeastern United States where it is widespread in open areas of native vegetation. It produces yellow-orange flowers in the summer and fall.

This species is highly variable throughout its range, and numerous species had previously been segregated out of it. However, their morphological differences have been found to be so overlapping that the former segregates are now considered the same species.

== Description ==
S. biflora is a branching perennial that grows 10–30 cm (4–12 in) tall. The stems are wiry, round, hairy, and light to medium green. Each compound leaf has three leaflets (trifoliate) and are alternate on the stems. The leaflets measure 1–4 cm (0.5–1.5 in) long and are elliptic in shape. They have smooth margins. A pair of partly joined bracts, or stipules, tapering to a beak, surrounds the base of each petiole and part of the adjacent stem.

The flowers are orange to yellow and are similar to others in the pea family. The petals consist of large standard top) petal and smaller wings and keel, subtended by bracts. The flowers are nearly circular in shape.

== Distribution and habitat ==
The species is native in the United States from Texas to the west, Illinois to the north, New York to the east, and Florida to the south. It is also present in Arizona. Its habitats include sunny and dry areas, such as glades, prairies, savannas, dry upland forests, tops of bluffs, and riverbanks.

== Ecology ==
The flowers bloom May to September and are visited by bees and butterflies. It is a host plant for the barred yellow butterfly (Eurema daira).
