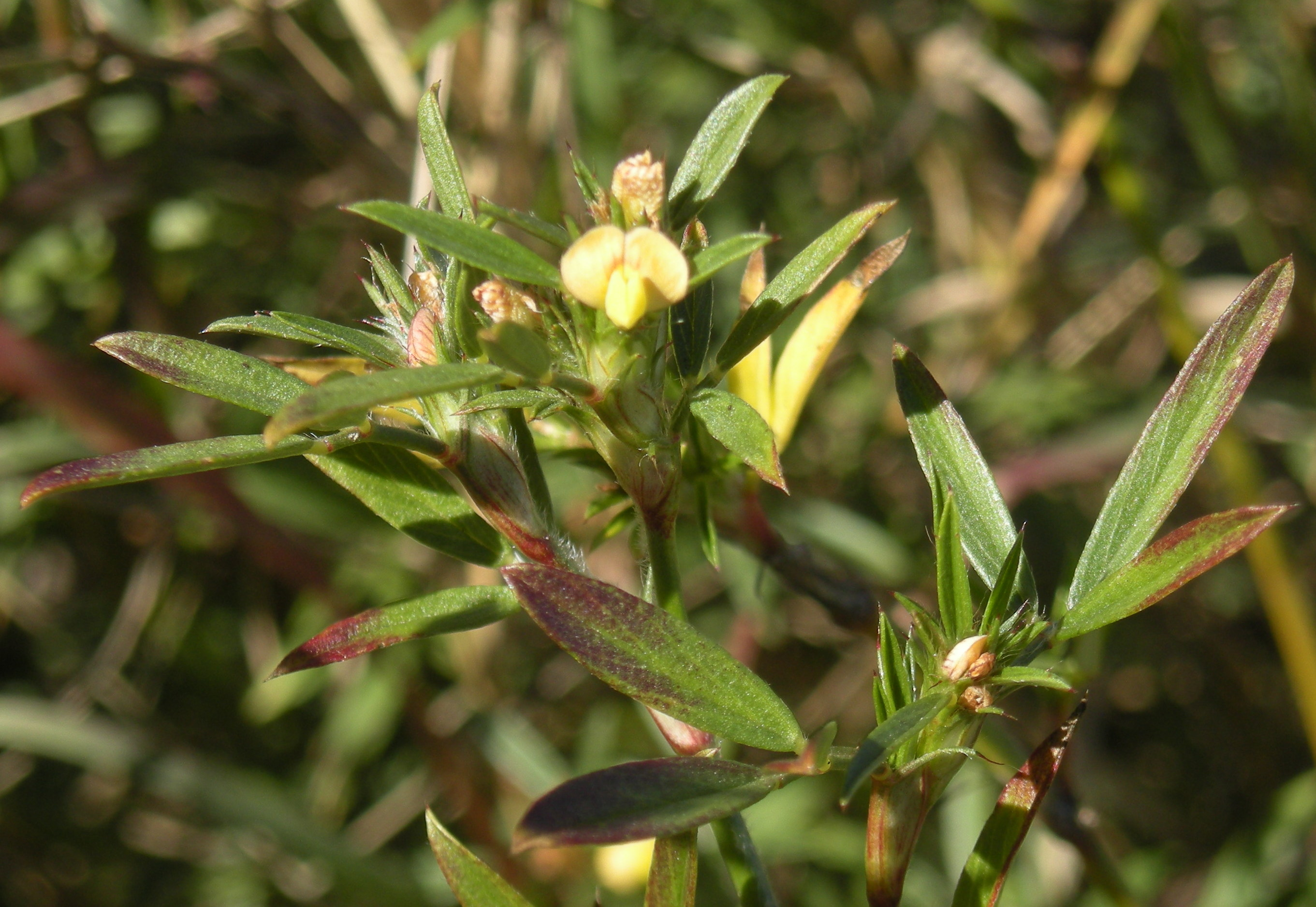
- Stylosanthes hamata

Scientific classification
- Kingdom: Plantae
- Clade: Tracheophytes
- Clade: Angiosperms
- Clade: Eudicots
- Clade: Rosids
- Order: Fabales
- Family: Fabaceae
- Subfamily: Faboideae
- Tribe: Dalbergieae
- Genus: Stylosanthes; Sw.

Species
- See text

= Stylosanthes =

Genus of legumes

Stylosanthes is a genus of flowering plants in the legume family Fabaceae and contains numerous highly important pasture and forage species. It was recently assigned to the informal monophyletic Pterocarpus clade of the Dalbergieae. The common name pencilflower is sometimes used for plants in this genus.

== Description ==
The genus is characterised by trifoliate leaves and small yellow flowers Species may be annual or perennial and morphology varies between species as well as within species in response to grazing pressure. Some species such as S. scabra grow as a low woody shrub to 1.5 m, while others such as S. humilis will grow as a herbaceous shrub but can adopt a prostrate growth form and thrive under high grazing pressure.

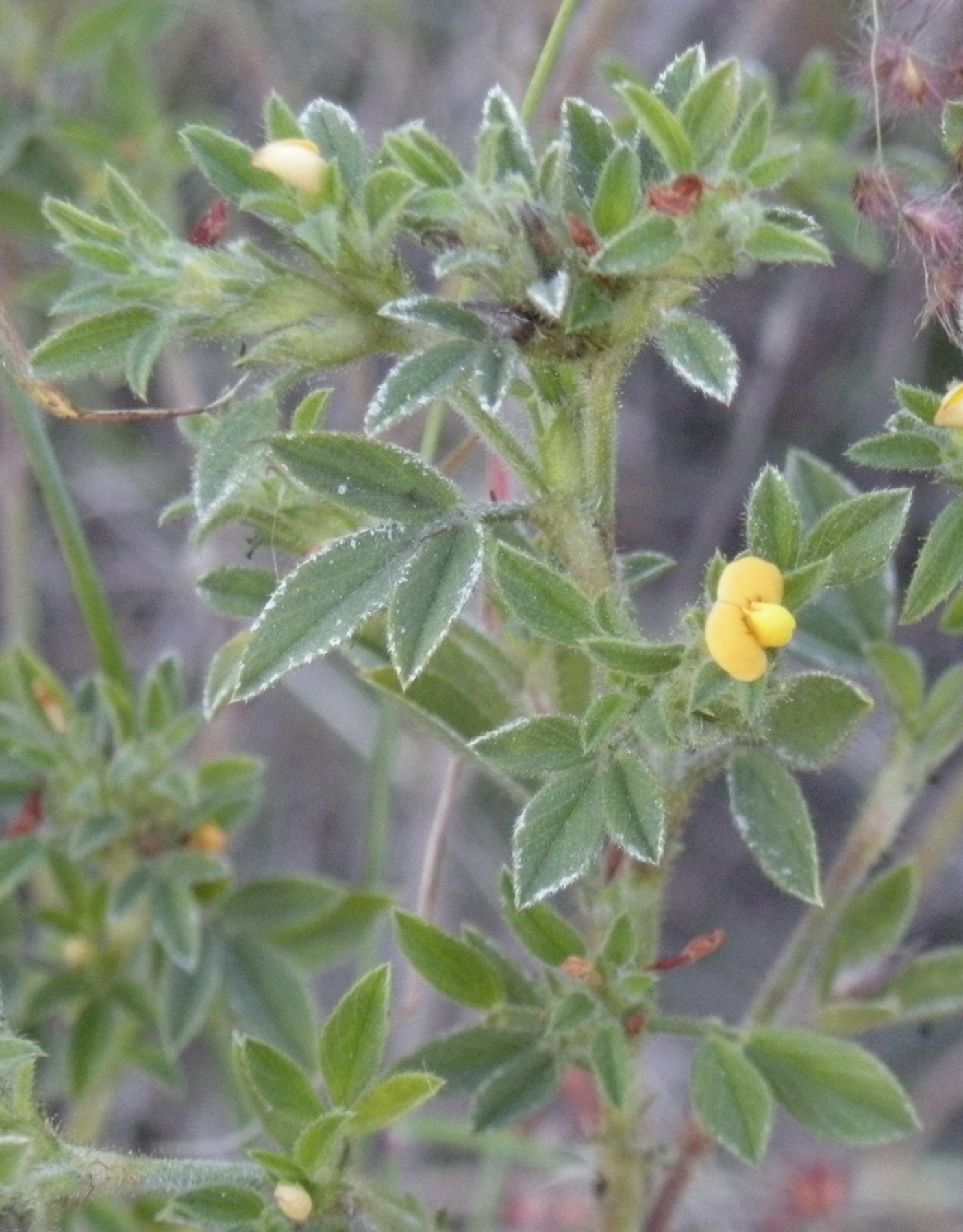
Stylosanthes scabra foliage and flowers, Central Queensland

== Taxonomy and range ==
Taxonomy of the genus remains unsettled and controversial, with various authors favouring between 25 and 42 species, with at least 40 additional synonyms. The taxonomy is complicated by the existence of numerous natural tetraploid and hybrid populations. Species within the genus fall within two subgenera: Styposanthes and Stylosanthes. Styposanthes possess a small rudimentary secondary floral axis, which is absent from Stylosanthes. Stylosanthes is closely related to the peanut genus Arachis.

All except two species of the genus are native to the Americas. S. fruticosa has a native range that extends from South Africa to Ethiopia, across Arabian Peninsula to Pakistan, India and Sri Lanka and S. erecta is endemic to Tropical Africa, from Tanzania to Senegal. The putative species S. sundaica, has a range that encompasses Malesia but is considered by most authors to be an adventive polypoliod variety of S. humilis. Ecological range extends from savanna and thorn scrub to tropical forest and montane forests.

== Species ==
The following species are accepted:

- Stylosanthes angustifolia Vogel
- Stylosanthes biflora (L.) Britton, Sterns & Poggenb.
- Stylosanthes bracteata Vogel
- Stylosanthes calcicola Small
- Stylosanthes campestris M.B.Ferreira & Sousa Costa
- Stylosanthes capitata Vogel
- Stylosanthes erecta P.Beauv.
- Stylosanthes falconensis Calles & Schultze-Kr.
- Stylosanthes fruticosa (Retz.) Alston
- Stylosanthes guianensis (Aubl.) Sw.
- Stylosanthes hamata (L.) Taub.
- Stylosanthes hippocampoides Mohlenbr.
- Stylosanthes hispida Rich.
- Stylosanthes humilis Kunth
- Stylosanthes ingrata S.F.Blake
- Stylosanthes leiocarpa Vogel
- Stylosanthes linearifolia M.B.Ferreira & Sousa Costa
- Stylosanthes longicarpa Brandão & Sousa Costa
- Stylosanthes longiseta Micheli
- Stylosanthes macrocarpa S.F.Blake
- Stylosanthes macrocephala M.B.Ferreira & Sousa Costa
- Stylosanthes macrosoma S.F.Blake
- Stylosanthes maracajuensis Sousa Costa & Van den Berg
- Stylosanthes mexicana Taub.
- Stylosanthes montevidensis Vogel
- Stylosanthes nervosa J.F.Macbr.
- Stylosanthes quintanarooensis Gama & Dávila
- Stylosanthes recta Vanni
- Stylosanthes rostrata (Burkart) Vanni
- Stylosanthes ruellioides Mart. ex Benth.
- Stylosanthes salina Sousa Costa & Van den Berg
- Stylosanthes scabra Vogel
- Stylosanthes seabrana B.L.Maass & 't Mannetje
- Stylosanthes sericeiceps S.F.Blake
- Stylosanthes suffruticosa Mohlenbr.
- Stylosanthes sympodialis Taub.
- Stylosanthes tuberculata S.F.Blake
- Stylosanthes vallsii Sousa Costa & Van den Berg
- Stylosanthes venezuelensis Calles & Schultze-Kr.
- Stylosanthes viscosa (L.) Sw.

== Usage ==
Species within the genus have many properties that make them valuable forage species. They are capable of nitrogen fixation and are capable of improving soil fertility in addition to providing high protein stock feed. The genus is also noted for its ability to extract phosphorus from soils where it is not available to other species. Seeds are hard and long lived leading to high soil seed banks and rapid recovery following fire or heavy grazing. Seed survives passage through the gut of grazing animals and is dispersed widely in this manner allowing for rapid dispersal. Many species are adapted to hot, dry climates and are drought resistant.

These traits have made the genus the world’s most widely used tropical pasture legume. Stylosanthes has been introduced across the tropical world as a pasture species. Its most important use has been in Australia where over a million hectares of primarily native pasture have been oversown with Stylosanthes species; primarily S. hamata, S. scabra and S. humilis This can lead to a ten-fold increase in productivity, though 2–3 fold increases are normal. Stylosanthes are the most important forage legumes in South America and the most important pasture legumes of tropical India. Stylosanthes are also important forage species in tropical Africa.

Stylosanthes are important green manure species in West and Central Africa, primarily S. guianensis and S. hamata, and species are planted and harvested for commercial leaf meal production for poultry and pig feed in China and India. The genus has also been used as a nitrogen input into low input or organic cropping systems. Species are used as fallow species in Peru, Africa and Australia. S. hamata used for intercropping with grain crops in India and Africa with yield increases up to 25%.

Stylosanthes species have been used for land reclamation, soil stabilization and soil regeneration work because of their drought resistance, ability to restore soil fertility, improve soil physical properties and provide permanent vegetation cover.

Despite their ability to dramatically improve productivity in grazing lands, Stylosanthes can also cause problems. Stylosanthes can dominate pasture at the expense of grass which can lead to problems because the plants provides less protection from erosion than grass. Stylosanthes dominance can also lead to soil acidification, as soil nitrate levels build up and are then leached down the soil profile. Stylosanthes species are considered invasive species and environmental weeds in Australia, Taiwan, the Pacific Islands and Hawaii. Many Stylosanthes species are susceptible to anthracnose fungus (Colletotrichum gloeosporioides) which retards growth and seed development, and this had led to numerous commercial cultivars being abandoned.

== Notes ==
^{1} ^{2} ^{4} ^{7} ^{8} ^{10} Some sources treat Stylosanthes acuminata, Stylosanthes aurea, Stylosanthes campestris, Stylosanthes gracilis, Stylosanthes grandifolia, and/or Stylosanthes hippocampoides as synonyms of Stylosanthes guianensis.
^{3} Some sources treat Stylosanthes bahiensis as a synonym of Stylosanthes pilosa.
^{5} Some sources treat Stylosanthes cayennensis as a synonym of Stylosanthes hispida.
^{6} ^{15} Some sources treat Stylosanthes figueroae and/or Stylosanthes sundaica as synonyms of Stylosanthes humilis.
^{9} Some sources treat Stylosanthes guineensis as a synonym of Stylosanthes erecta.
^{11} Some sources treat Stylosanthes macrosoma as a synonym of Stylosanthes montevidensis.
^{12} ^{14} ^{16} Some sources treat Stylosanthes nervosa, Stylosanthes suffruticosa, and/or Stylosanthes tuberculata as synonyms of Stylosanthes scabra.
^{13} Some sources treat Stylosanthes subsericea as a synonym of Stylosanthes macrocarpa.
