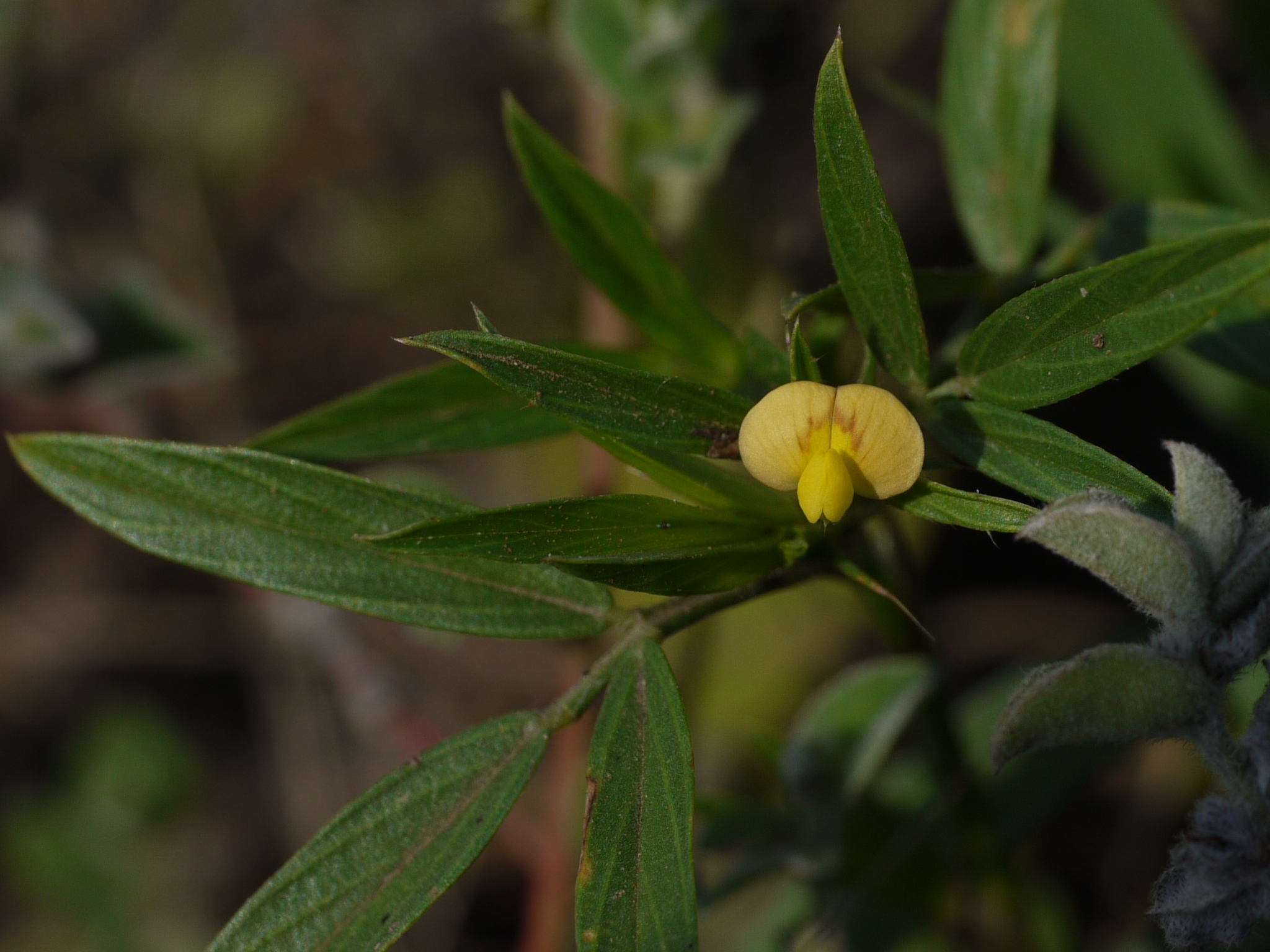
- Close-up of flower and leaves
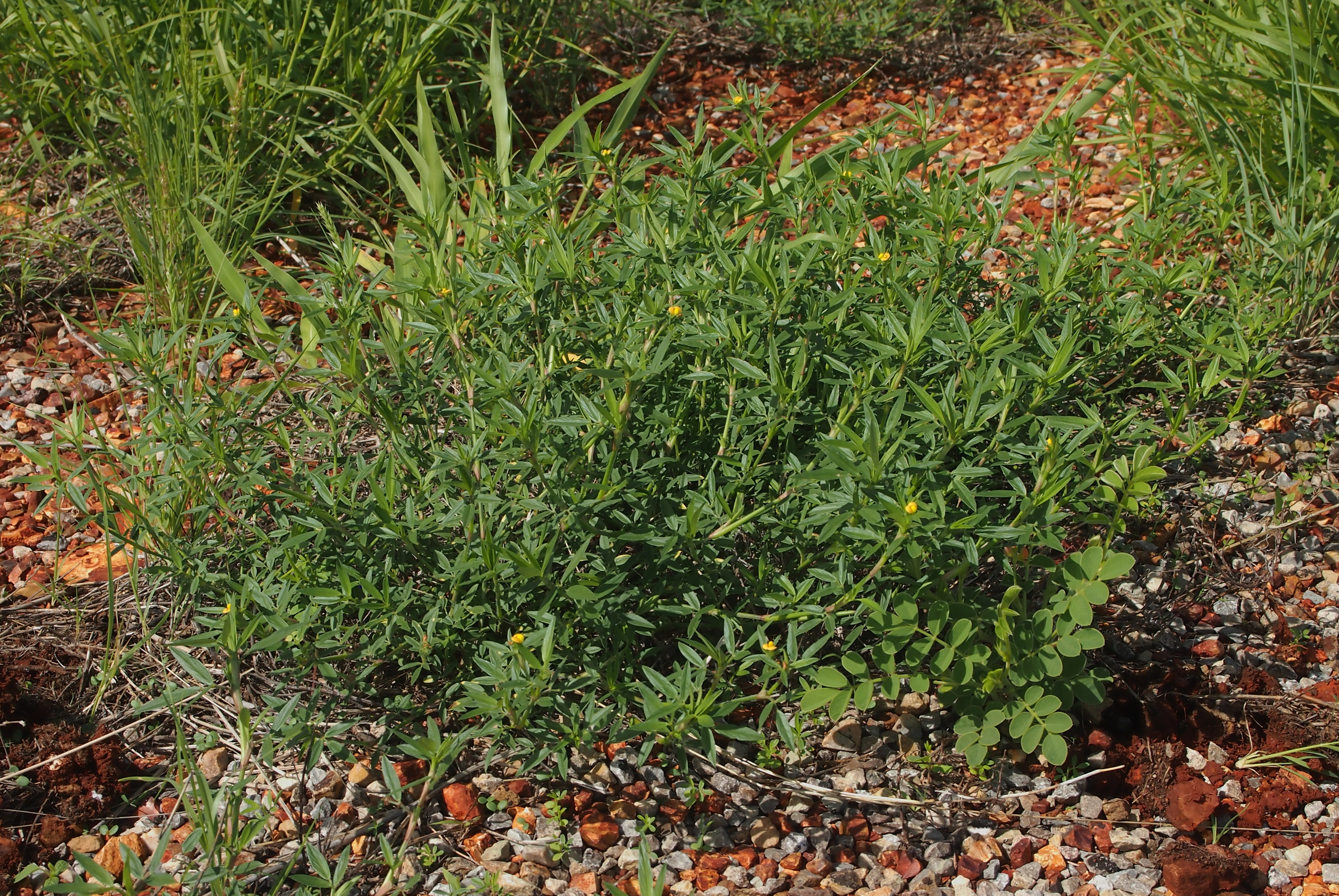
- Habit

Scientific classification
- Kingdom: Plantae
- Clade: Tracheophytes
- Clade: Angiosperms
- Clade: Eudicots
- Clade: Rosids
- Order: Fabales
- Family: Fabaceae
- Subfamily: Faboideae
- Genus: Stylosanthes
- Species: S. hamata

Binomial name
- Stylosanthes hamata (L.) Taub.

Synonyms
- List: Anonis americana Aubl.; Hedysarum hamatum L.; Ononis cerrifolia Rchb. ex DC.; Stylosanthes eriocarpa S.F.Blake; Stylosanthes humilis Rich. ex Hemsl.; Stylosanthes procumbens Sw.

= Stylosanthes hamata =

Species of flowering plant

Stylosanthes hamata, the Caribbean stylo, is a species of flowering plant in the family Fabaceae. It is native to the islands of the Caribbean, and nearby areas on the mainland; Mexico, Guatemala, Costa Rica, Colombia, and Venezuela, and it has been introduced as a forage crop to Florida, Peru, Brazil, the Gambia, Burkina Faso, Benin, India, Thailand, Hainan, and northern Australia. There are diploid and tetraploid cultivars, with the tetraploids being more drought tolerant and more frequently sown for pasture.
