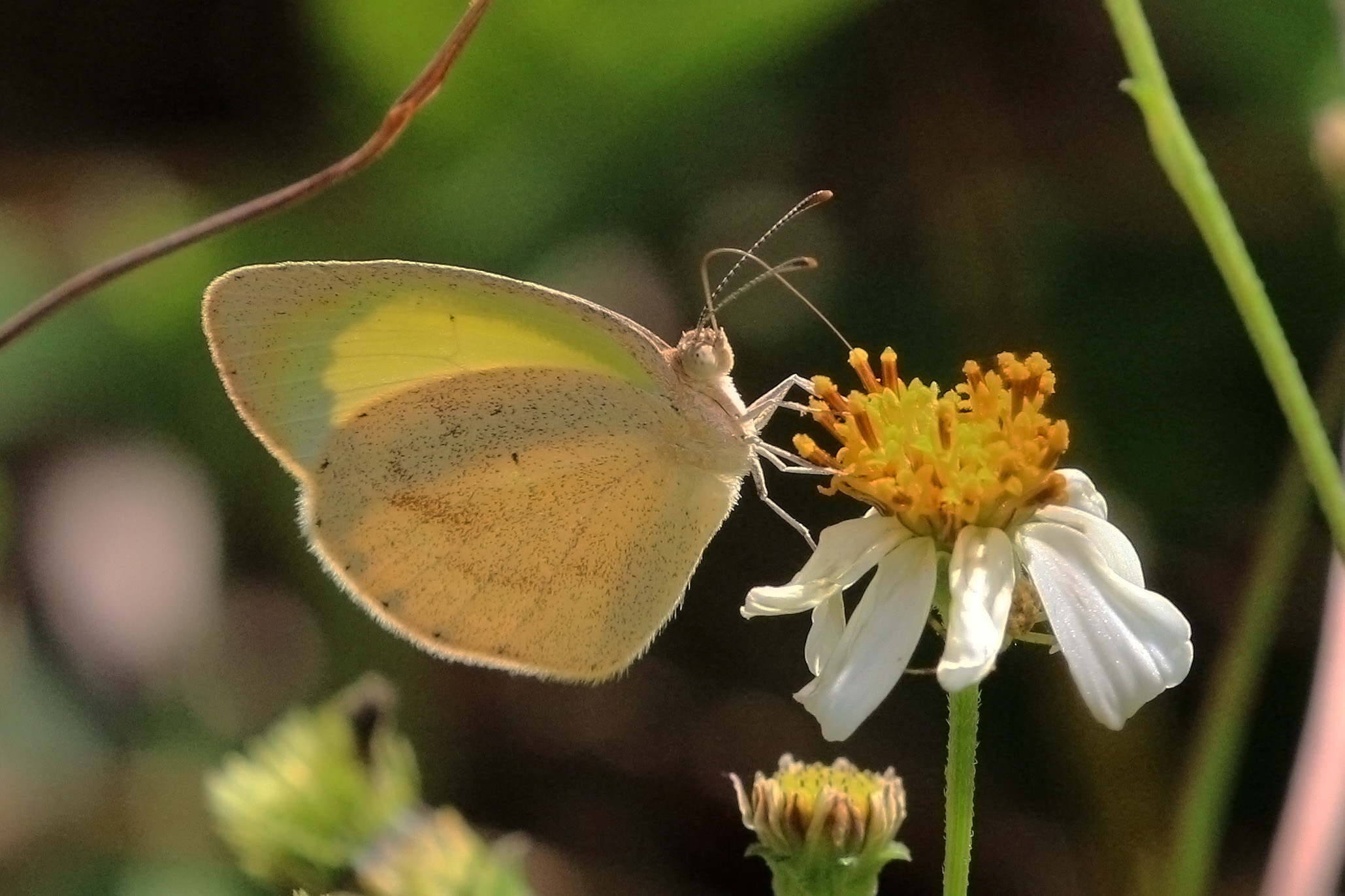
- E. d. palmira, Cuba

Conservation status
- Secure (NatureServe)

Scientific classification
- Kingdom: Animalia
- Phylum: Arthropoda
- Class: Insecta
- Order: Lepidoptera
- Family: Pieridae
- Genus: Eurema
- Species: E. daira

Binomial name
- Eurema daira (Godart, [1819])

Synonyms
- Pieris daira Godart, [1819]; Papilio delia Cramer, [1780]; Eurema demoditas Hübner, [1819]; Xanthidia jucunda Boisduval & Leconte, 1829; Terias lemnia C. Felder & R. Felder, 1865; Terias jucunda; Eurema jucunda; Terias palmira Poey, [1852]; Terias ebriola Poey, [1853]; Terias albina Poey, [1853]; Terias cubana Herrich-Schäffer, 1865; Eurema palmira; Terias solana Reakirt, 1866; Terias persistens Butler & H. Druce, 1872; Terias sidonia R. Felder, 1869; Terias lydia C. Felder & R. Felder, 1861; Terias rhodia C. Felder & R. Felder, 1861; Terias medutina C. Felder & R. Felder, 1861; Terias phoenicia C. Felder & R. Felder, 1865; Terias lydia

= Eurema daira =

Species of butterfly

Eurema daira, the fairy yellow, barred yellow or barred sulphur, is a butterfly of the family Pieridae. The species was first described by Jean-Baptiste Godart in 1819. It is found from Argentina north to the southern United States. Strays can be found up to southern Arizona, South Dakota, southern Texas and even Washington, D.C.

The wingspan is 32–41 mm. Adults are on wing year round in the southern part of the range and in late summer and fall as vagrant.

The larvae feed on Fabaceae species, including Stylosanthes biflora and Aeschynomene species. Adults feed on the nectar of various flowers including joint vetches and shepherd's needle, and are the principal pollinators of Cnidoscolus urens.

== Subspecies ==
- E. d. daira (Virginia, New York, Virginia, Louisiana, Georgia, Florida)
- E. d. palmira (Poey, [1852]) (West Indies, Cuba, Bahamas)
- E. d. eugenia (Wallengren, 1860) (Mexico, Panama, Costa Rica, Guatemala)
- E. d. sidonia (R. Felder, 1869) (Mexico)
- E. d. lydia (C. Felder & R. Felder, 1861) (Venezuela, Colombia)
- E. d. macheti Brévignon, 1996 (French Guiana)
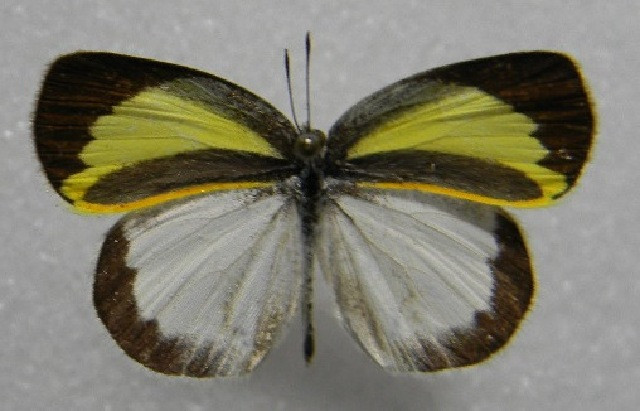
Male

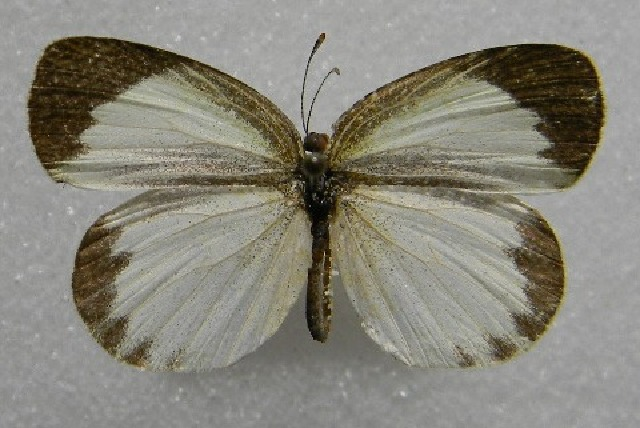
Female

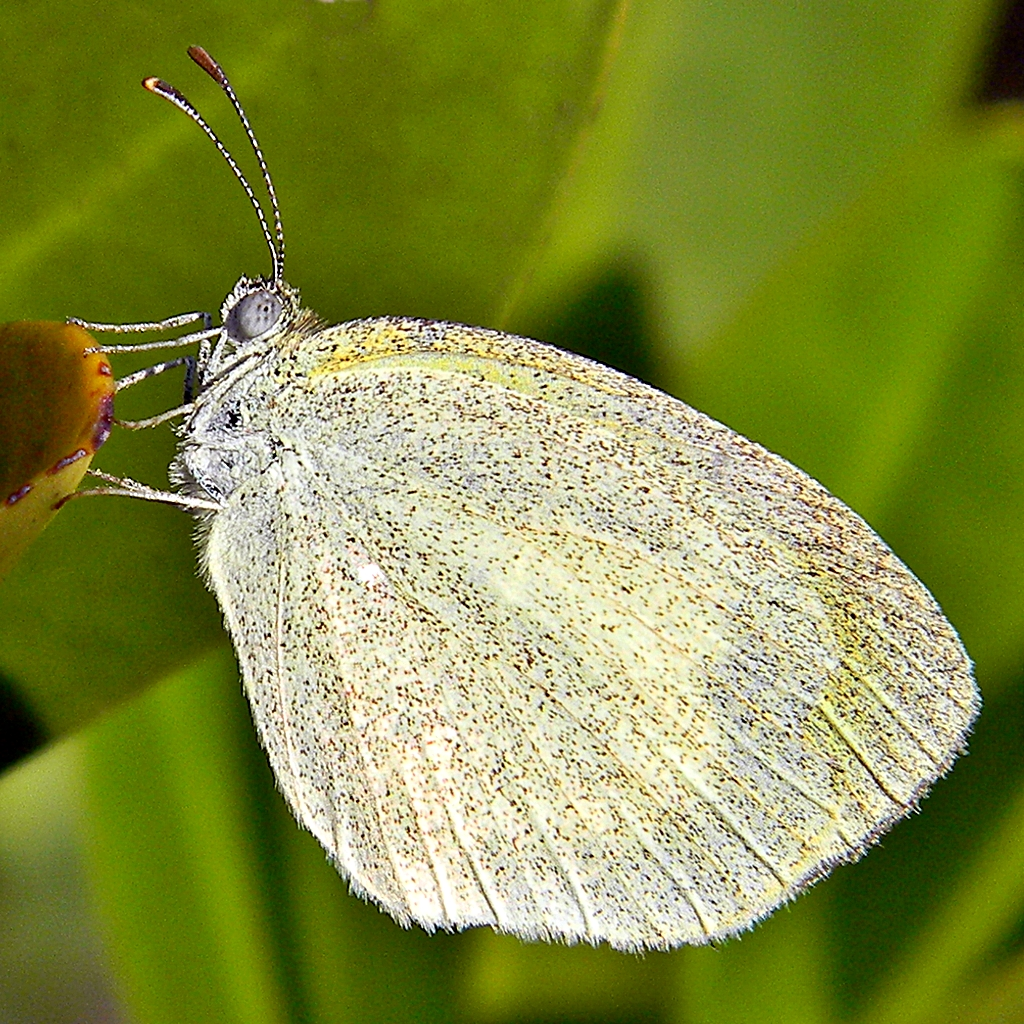
E. d. daira, Florida

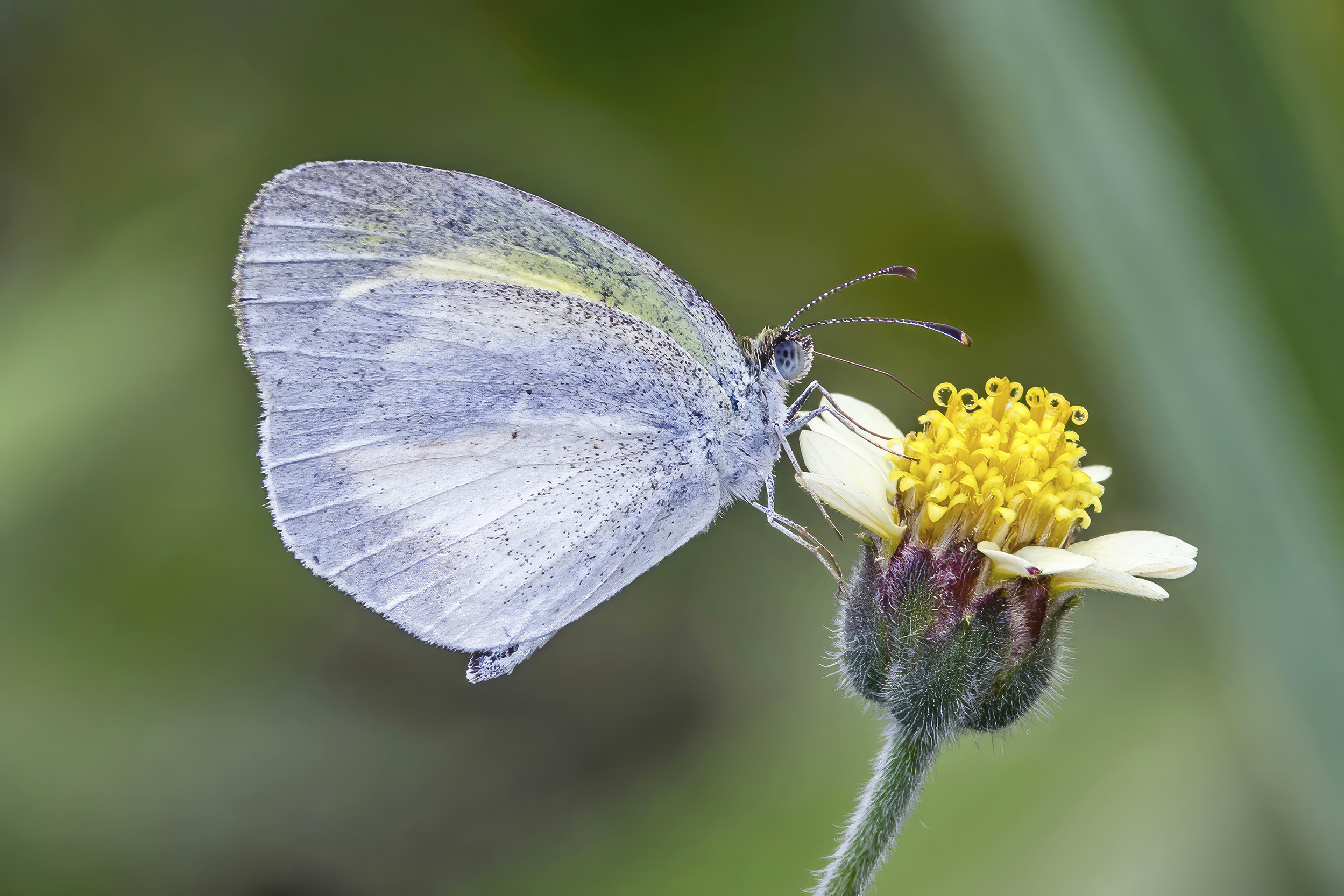
E. d. eugenia, Honduras
