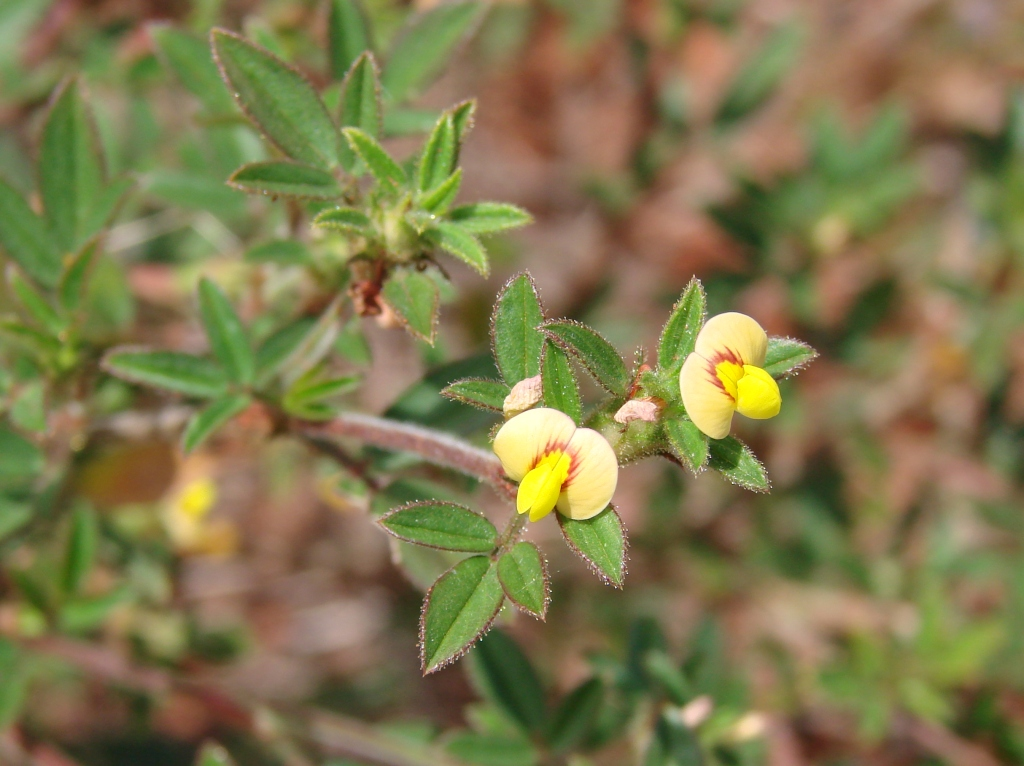
- In bloom
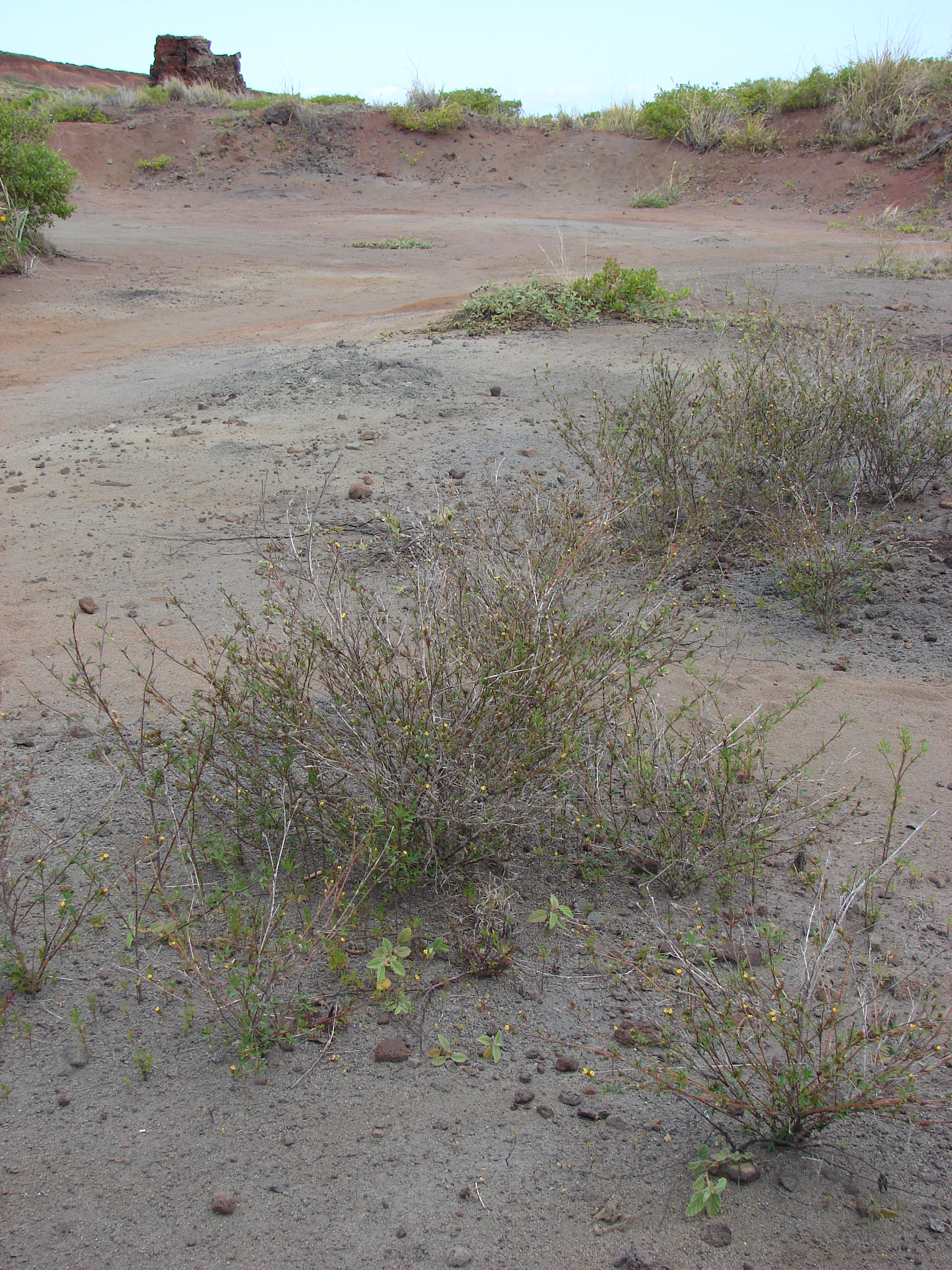
- Habit

Scientific classification
- Kingdom: Plantae
- Clade: Tracheophytes
- Clade: Angiosperms
- Clade: Eudicots
- Clade: Rosids
- Order: Fabales
- Family: Fabaceae
- Subfamily: Faboideae
- Genus: Stylosanthes
- Species: S. scabra

Binomial name
- Stylosanthes scabra Vogel

Synonyms
- Stylosanthes diarthra S.F.Blake; Stylosanthes gloiodes S.F.Blake; Stylosanthes plicata S.F.Blake; Stylosanthes scoparia Standl. & L.O.Williams; Stylosanthes subsericea S.F.Blake

= Stylosanthes scabra =

Species of flowering plant

Stylosanthes scabra, the shrubby stylo, is a species of flowering plant in the family Fabaceae, native to tropical South America, and introduced to Hawaii and Australia. It is widely planted as a drought‑tolerant livestock forage.
