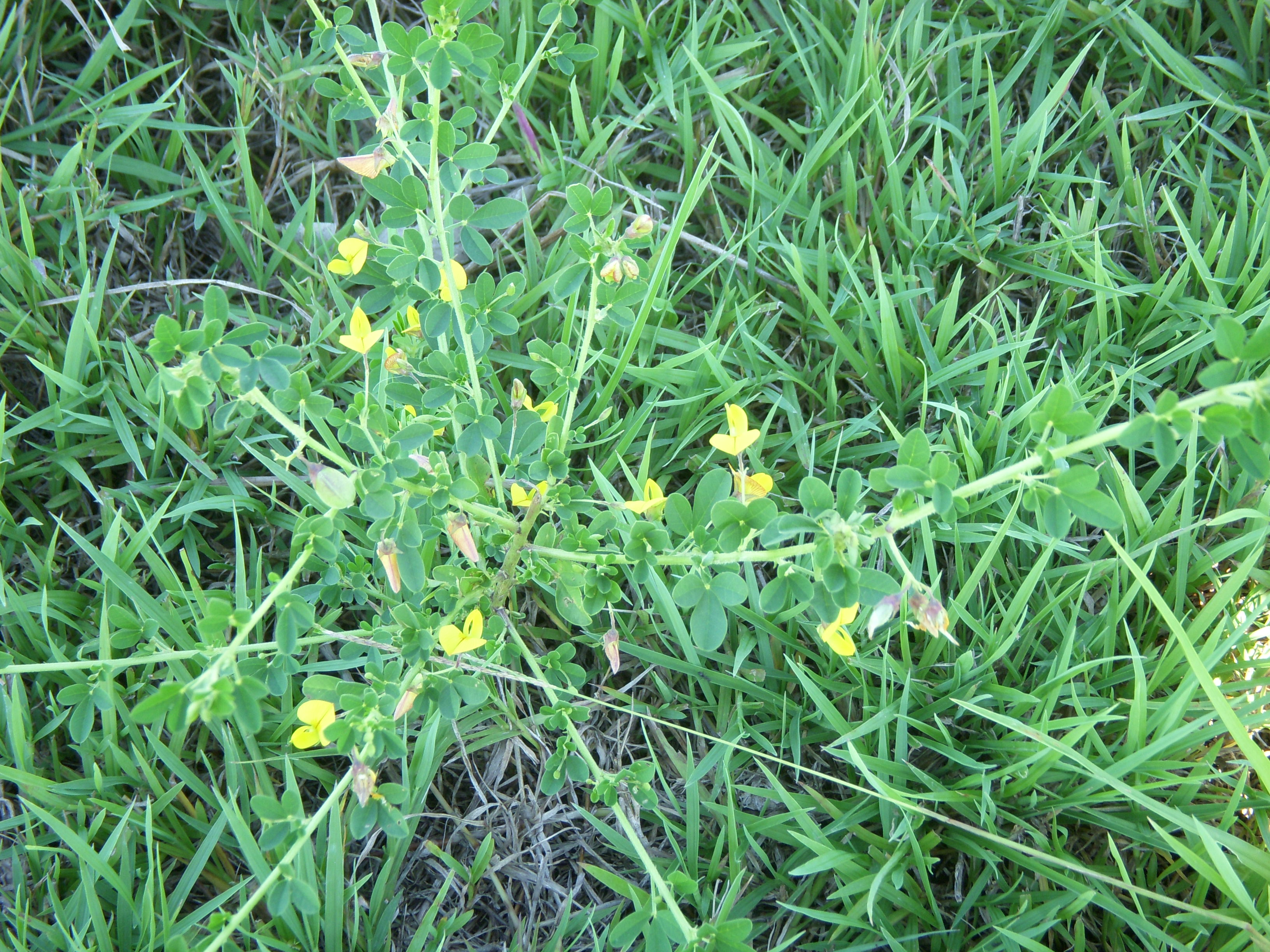
- Habit
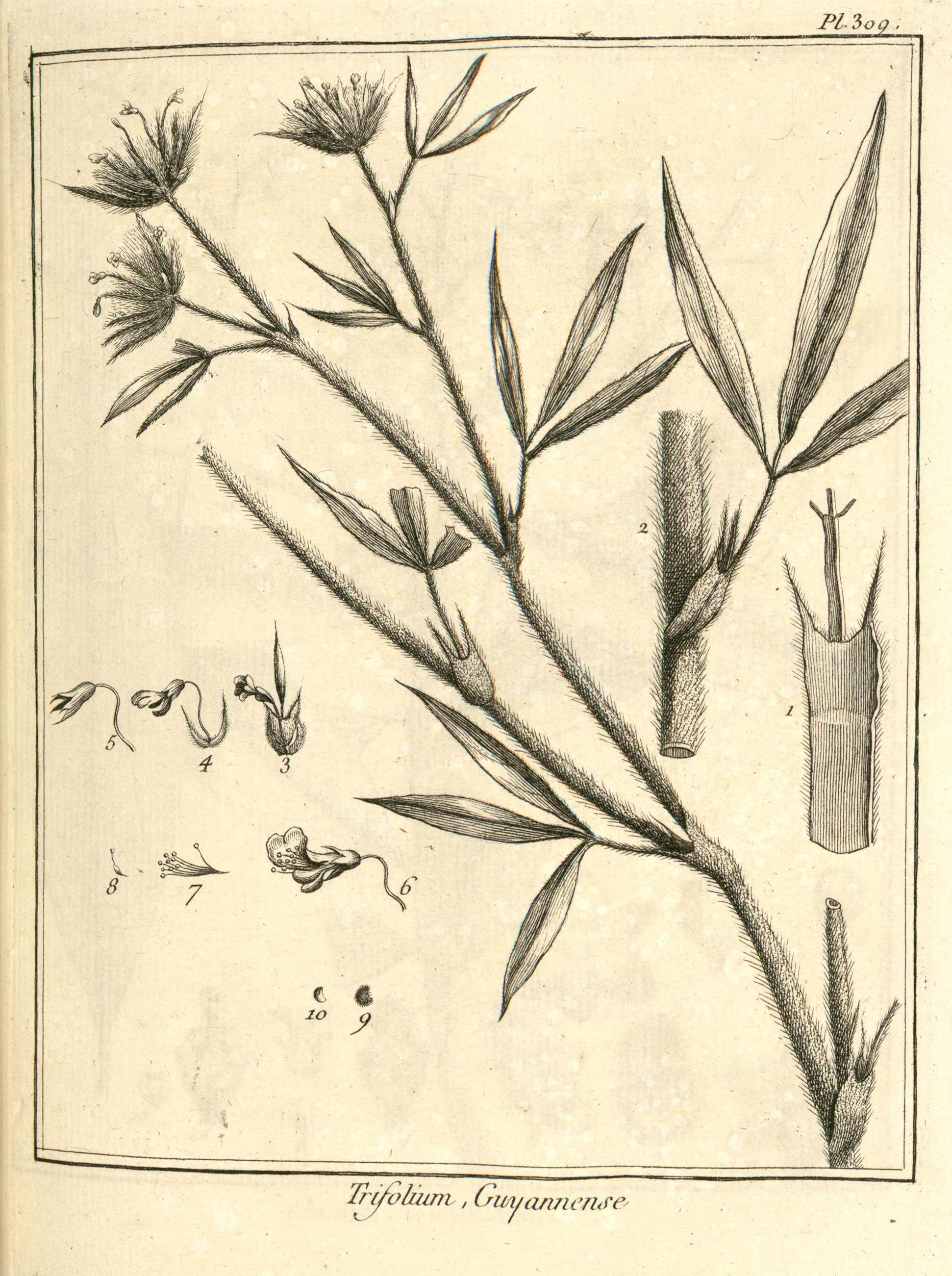
- Botanical illustration

Scientific classification
- Kingdom: Plantae
- Clade: Embryophytes
- Clade: Tracheophytes
- Clade: Spermatophytes
- Clade: Angiosperms
- Clade: Eudicots
- Clade: Rosids
- Order: Fabales
- Family: Fabaceae
- Subfamily: Faboideae
- Genus: Stylosanthes
- Species: S. guianensis

Binomial name
- Stylosanthes guianensis (Aubl.) Sw.

Synonyms
- List: Astyposanthes gracilis (Kunth) Herter; Astyposanthes guianensis (Aubl.) Herter; Astyposanthes subviscosa (Benth.) Herter; Stylosanthes acuminata M.B.Ferreira & Sousa Costa; Stylosanthes aurea M.B.Ferreira & Sousa Costa; Stylosanthes biflora var. guianensis (Aubl.) Kuntze; Stylosanthes dissitiflora B.L.Rob. & Seaton; Stylosanthes eciliata S.F.Blake; Stylosanthes gracilis Kunth; Stylosanthes gracilis var. subviscosa (Benth.) Burkart; Stylosanthes grandifolia M.B.Ferreira & Sousa Costa; Stylosanthes guianensis var. dissitiflora (B.L.Rob. & Seaton) 't Mannetje; Stylosanthes guianensis f. esetosa Hassl.; Stylosanthes guianensis var. marginata Hassl.; Stylosanthes guianensis var. pubescens Pilg.; Stylosanthes guianensis var. robusta 't Mannetje; Stylosanthes guianensis var. subviscosa Benth.; Stylosanthes guianensis f. viscosissima Hassl.; Stylosanthes guineensis G.Don; Stylosanthes juncea f. intermedia Chodat & Hassl.; Stylosanthes nunoi Brandão; Stylosanthes purpurata S.F.Blake; Stylosanthes surinamensis Miq.; Stylosanthes virgata Mart. ex Colla; Stylosanthes viscosa var. acutifolia Benth.; Trifolium fluminense Vell.; Trifolium guianense Aubl.

= Stylosanthes guianensis =

Species of flowering plant

Stylosanthes guianensis, the stylo, is a species of flowering plant in the family Fabaceae. It is native to the New World Tropics and Subtropics, and has been introduced to Puerto Rico, the Windward Islands, Trinidad and Tobago, most of Sub‑Saharan Africa, Madagascar, Mauritius, Réunion, Rodrigues, the Indian Subcontinent, Sri Lanka, Thailand, southeast China, Hainan, Taiwan, New Guinea, Queensland, New Caledonia, and the Cook Islands. An important forage and fodder species, its palatability to livestock increases as the plant matures, making it an unusual, and valuable, deferred feed. It has high genetic diversity between and among its named varieties.

== Subtaxa ==
The following subtaxa are accepted:

- Stylosanthes guianensis subsp. dissitiflora (B.L.Rob. & Seaton) Mohlenbr. – Mexico, Honduras
- Stylosanthes guianensis var. gracilis (Kunth) Vogel – Guatemala to Argentina, and a few introductions in Africa
- Stylosanthes guianensis subsp. guianensis – Entire range, also the most introduced subtaxon
- Stylosanthes guianensis var. pauciflora M.B.Ferreira & Sousa Costa – Colombia, Venezuela, Brazil
