= Stratification (seeds) =

Process of inducing seeds to sprout

In horticulture, stratification is a process of treating seeds to simulate natural conditions that the seeds must experience before germination can occur. Many seed species have an embryonic dormancy phase and generally will not sprout until this dormancy is broken.

The practice of stratification can be traced back to at least 1664 in John Evelyn's Sylva, or A Discourse of Forest-Trees and the Propagation of Timber, where seeds were layered (stratified) between layers of moist soil and the strata were exposed to winter conditions. Thus, stratification became the process by which seeds were artificially exposed to conditions to encourage germination.

== Cold stratification ==
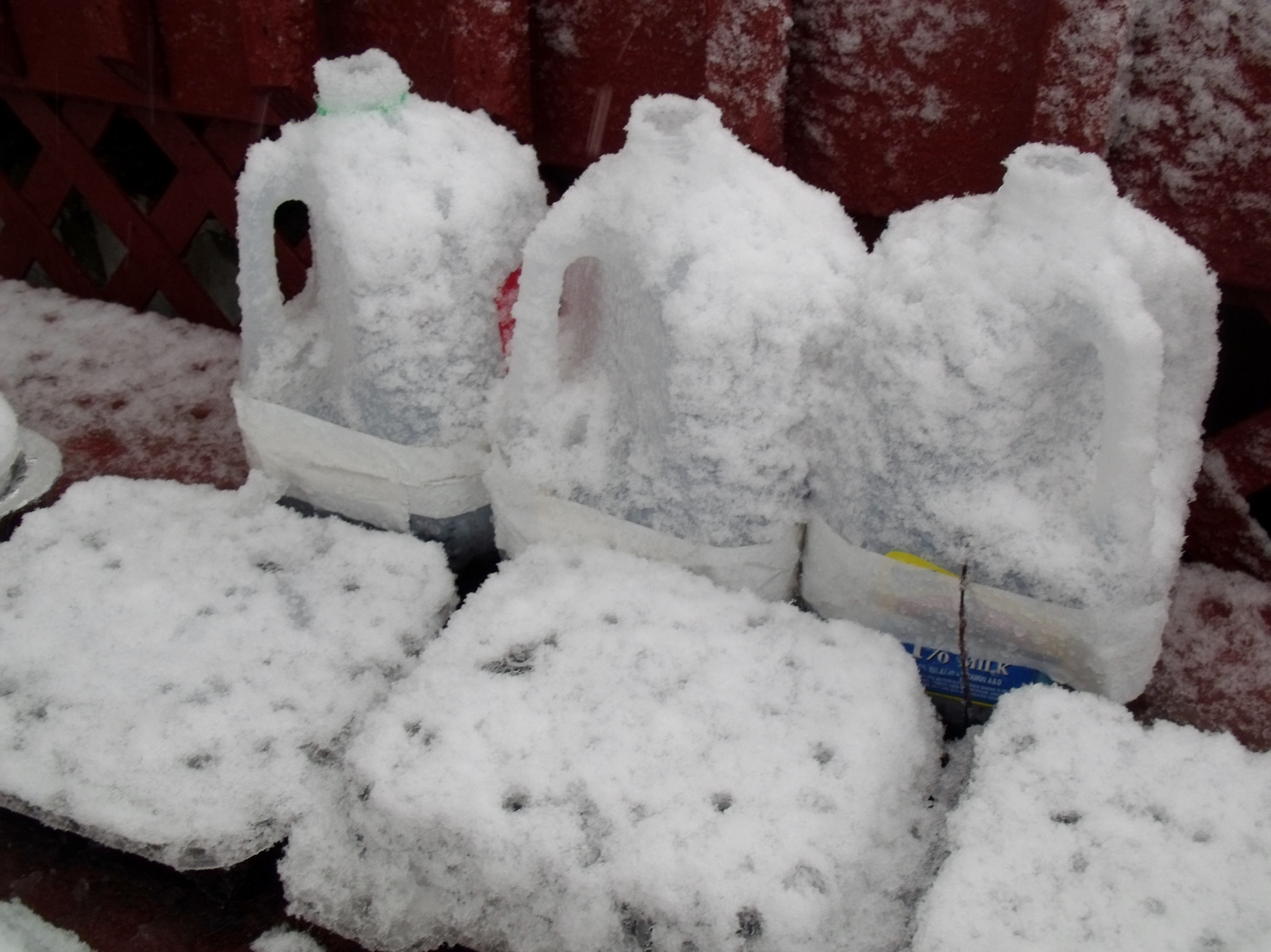
Plastic containers are used to protect seeds from pests outdoors during cold stratification

Cold stratification is the process of subjecting seeds to both cold and moist conditions. Seeds of many trees, shrubs and perennials require these conditions before germination will ensue.

In the wild, seed dormancy is usually overcome by the seed spending time in the ground through a winter period and having its hard seed coat softened by frost and weathering action. By doing so the seed is undergoing a natural form of "cold stratification" or pretreatment. This cold moist period triggers the seed's embryo; its growth and subsequent expansion eventually break through the softened seed coat in its search for sun and nutrients.

Cold stratification simulates the natural process by subjecting seed to a cool (ideally +1 to +3 °C [34 to 37 degrees Fahrenheit]) moist environment for a period one to three months. Seeds are placed in a medium such as vermiculite, peat, or sand and refrigerated in a plastic bag or sealed container. Soaking the seeds in cold water for 6–12 hours before placing them in cold stratification can cut down on the amount of time needed for stratification, as the seed needs to absorb some moisture to enable the chemical changes that take place.

Use of a fungicide to moisten the stratifying vermiculite will help prevent fungal diseases. Chinosol (8-quinolyl potassium sulfate) is one such fungicide used to inhibit Botrytis cinerea infections.

== Warm and cold stratification ==
Any seeds that are indicated as needing a period of warm stratification followed by cold stratification should be subjected to the same measures, but the seeds should additionally be stratified in a warm area first, followed by the cold period in a refrigerator later. Warm stratification requires temperatures of 15–20 °C (59–68 °F). In many instances, warm stratification followed by cold stratification requirements can also be met by planting the seeds in summer in a mulched bed for expected germination the following spring. Some seeds may not germinate until the second spring.

== See also ==
- Scarification (botany) – process to improve germination by making seeds more permeable
- Vernalization – induction of flowering using cold
