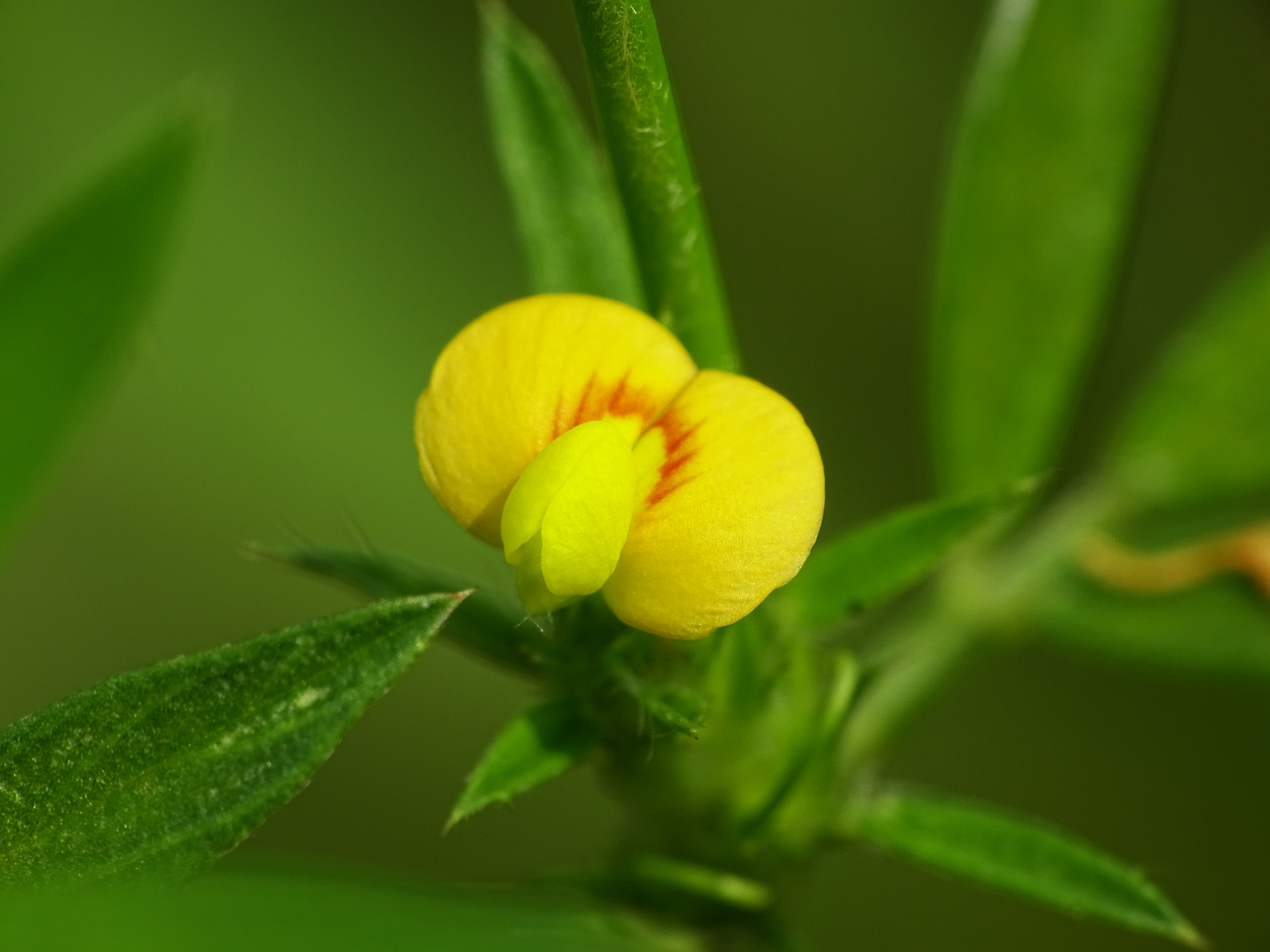
- Close-up of flower
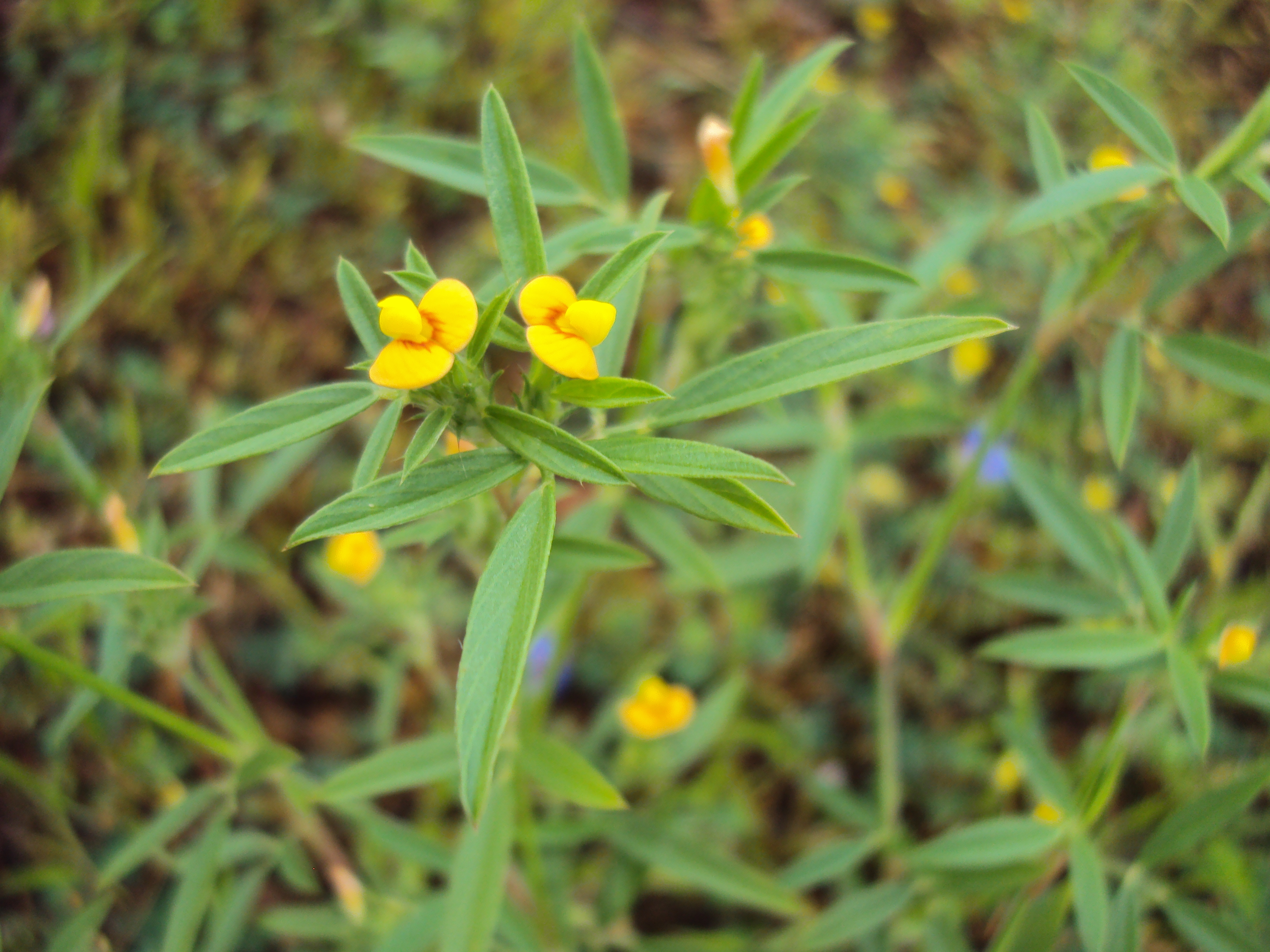
- Flowers and foliage

Scientific classification
- Kingdom: Plantae
- Clade: Embryophytes
- Clade: Tracheophytes
- Clade: Spermatophytes
- Clade: Angiosperms
- Clade: Eudicots
- Clade: Rosids
- Order: Fabales
- Family: Fabaceae
- Subfamily: Faboideae
- Genus: Stylosanthes
- Species: S. fruticosa

Binomial name
- Stylosanthes fruticosa (Retz.) Alston

Synonyms
- List: Arachis fruticosa Retz.; Hedysarum hamatum Burm.f.; Stylosanthes aprica Span.; Stylosanthes bojeri Vogel; Stylosanthes flavicans Baker; Stylosanthes mucronata Willd.; Stylosanthes setosa Harv.; Stylosanthes suborbiculata Chiov.

= Stylosanthes fruticosa =

Species of flowering plant

Stylosanthes fruticosa (syn. Arachis fruticosa), the African stylo, wild lucerne or shrubby pencil‑flower, is a species of flowering plant in the family Fabaceae. It is native to Cape Verde, sub-Saharan Africa, Madagascar, the Arabian Peninsula, India, Sri Lanka and Myanmar, and has been introduced to Hawaii. Relished by livestock, it can survive light shade, acid soils and even light frosts. It grows from sea level to 2,000 m (6,600 ft) on as little as 300 mm (12 in) of rain per year.
