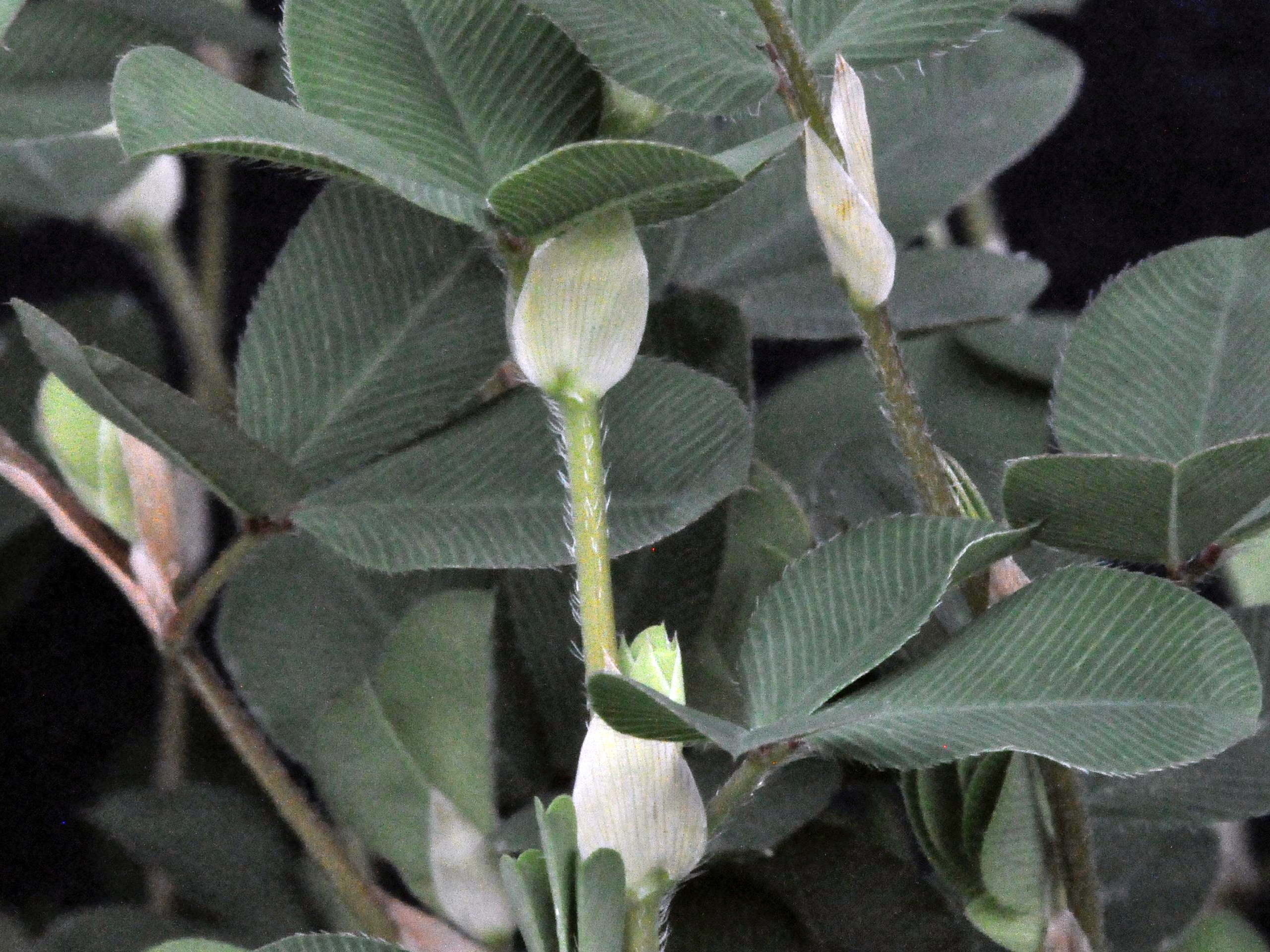

Scientific classification
- Kingdom: Plantae
- Clade: Tracheophytes
- Clade: Angiosperms
- Clade: Eudicots
- Clade: Rosids
- Order: Fabales
- Family: Fabaceae
- Subfamily: Faboideae
- Genus: Kummerowia
- Species: K. stipulacea

Binomial name
- Kummerowia stipulacea (Maxim.) Makino

Synonyms
- Homotypic Synonyms: Lespedeza stipulacea Maxim.; Lespedeza striata var. stipulacea (Maxim.) Debeaux; Microlespedeza stipulacea (Maxim.) Makino

= Kummerowia stipulacea =

Species of legume

Kummerowia stipulacea is a species of flowering plant in the family Fabaceae. It is known by the common name Korean clover. It is native to China, Japan, Korea, Mongolia, Taiwan, and Russia, and it is present in the eastern United States as an introduced species.

This annual herb grows prostrate, spreading, or erect stems. It grows up to 60 centimeters tall. The leaves are made up of three oval leaflets. One to five flowers occur in the leaf axils. There are cleistogamous flowers, which self-fertilize and never open, and chasmogamous flowers, which open and receive pollen from other plants. The latter flower type is purple-blue in color. The fruit is a small legume pod containing one seed. Though it often co-occurs with its congener Kummerowia striata, it is easily identified by large papery stipules which are especially visible for young leaves.

This plant was introduced to the United States when it was intentionally planted in Arlington, Virginia, by the USDA in 1919. This species and Japanese clover were used to revegetate abandoned coal mine sites. Its seed was spread to attract wildlife and as a forage for livestock. It was used to prevent erosion along roadsides. It was planted in rotation with cereal crops to enhance the soil. It persisted and spread. Today this plant grows in the wild and provides food for a number of mammal and bird species. It is also a high-quality livestock forage. The seed is still sold for planting. Three cultivars are available: "Climax", "Harbin", and "Rowan". Despite its status as a weed in some areas, it is not very aggressive and not considered a noxious weed.
