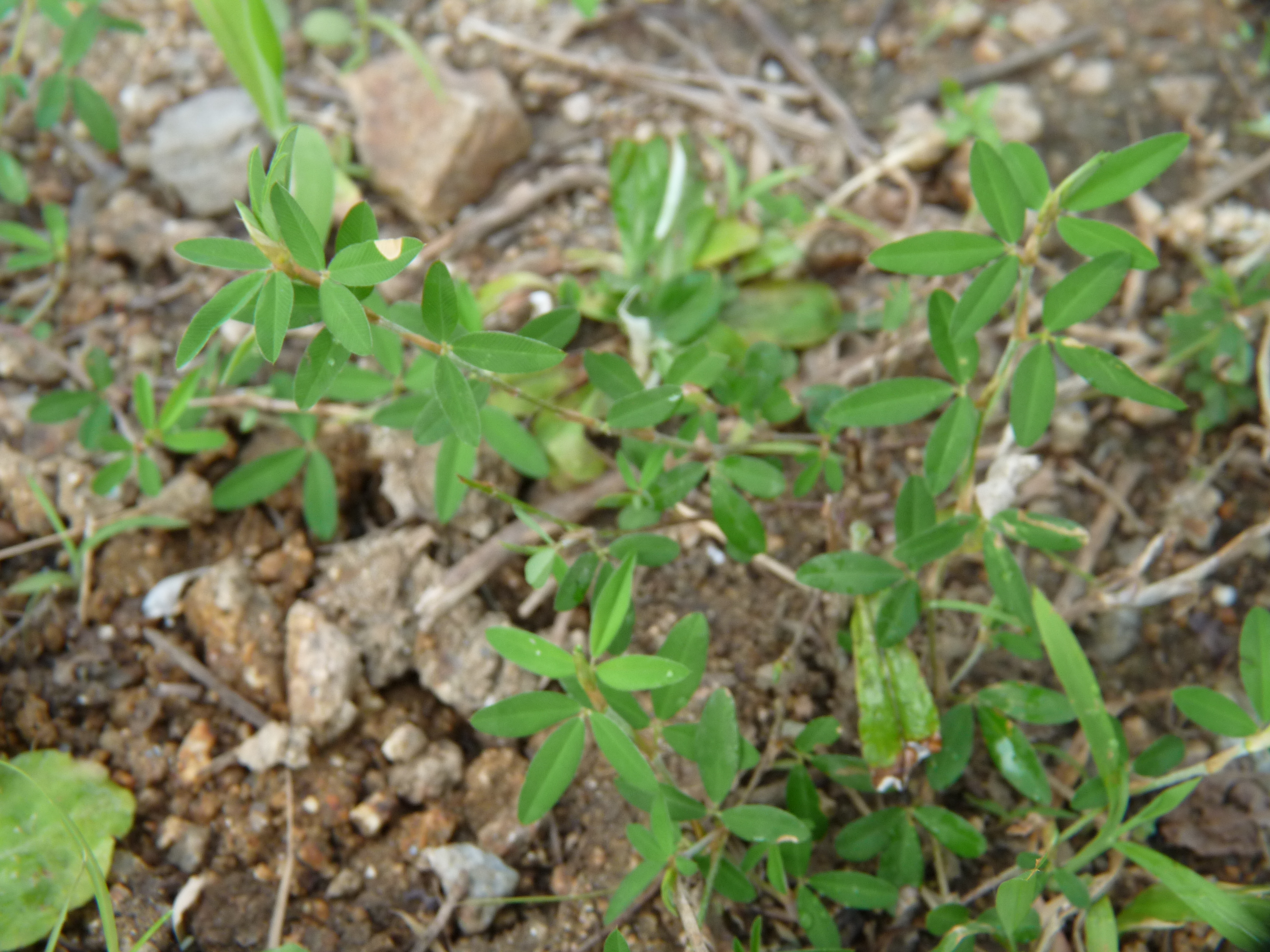

Scientific classification
- Kingdom: Plantae
- Clade: Embryophytes
- Clade: Tracheophytes
- Clade: Spermatophytes
- Clade: Angiosperms
- Clade: Eudicots
- Clade: Rosids
- Order: Fabales
- Family: Fabaceae
- Subfamily: Faboideae
- Genus: Kummerowia
- Species: K. striata

Binomial name
- Kummerowia striata (Thunb.) Schindl.

Synonyms
- Desmodium striatum (Thunb.) DC.; Hedysarum striatum Thunb.; Lespedeza striata (Thunb.) Hook. & Arn.; Meibomia striata (Thunb.) Kuntze; Microlespedeza makinoi Tanaka; Microlespedeza striata (Thunb.) Makino)

= Kummerowia striata =

Species of legume

Kummerowia striata is a species of flowering plant in the legume family known by the common names Japanese clover and common lespedeza. It is native to much of Asia and it is present in the eastern United States as an introduced species.

This annual herb grows prostrate, spreading, or erect stems. It grows up to 40 cm (16 in) tall. The leaves are made up of three oval leaflets. Flowers occur in the leaf axils. There are cleistogamous flowers, which self-fertilize and never open, and chasmogamous flowers, which open and receive pollen from other plants. The fruit is a small legume pod containing one seed.

At the close of the American Civil War, this plant appeared all over the southern United States. It was likely introduced to North America accidentally, possibly as a seed contaminant, but it was later imported and planted intentionally. It was used to vegetate pastures and provide forage for livestock. Along with Korean clover it was used to revegetate abandoned coal mine sites and to prevent erosion, as it thrives in sandy soils that have been disturbed by human activity. It is still used today. Cultivars are available, including "Kobe".

It has benefits to human health and agriculture, as well as providing a food source to numerous species across the food web. Nevertheless, this plant is sometimes invasive.

== Description ==
Kummerowia striata can grow to be 16 inches (41 cm) tall. Leaves grow alternate from one another, and only grow to be 0.75 inches (19 mm) long. The leaf edges have no teeth or lobes. The tops of the leaves are dark green, and the bottom of the leaf is light green. The plant grows 0.2–0.3 inches (5.1–7.6 mm) long flowers in three different colors, pink, purple, and white. Flowers sprout from leaf axils in clusters of 1–3. The petals and sepals are fused at the base to form a cup like structure. K. striata has both male and female parts and can either self-pollinate or be pollinated by insects. Each flower has five petals and a light green calyx with five teeth. The plant has two types of flowers, one has colored petals and the other has no petals. K. striata blooms for approximately two months (August to September), from the summer into the fall. In the following two months (October to November) the seeds ripen. The fruits are 0.2 inches (5.1 mm) long and each contain one seed. The fruit is dry and stays intact when ripe. The plant is an annual, but re-seed prolifically.

== Classification ==
Kummerowia striata was formerly classified as Lespedeza striata. Its common names include Japanese clover and common lespedeza. Kummerowia striata is in a genus with one other species, Kummerowia stipulacea. They are both herbaceous legumes and can be differentiated by their calyx coverings. The calyx of K. stipulacea covers 1/3 to 1/2 of the legume, whereas K. striata′s calyx covers 1/2 to 4/5 of the legume.

== Distribution and habitat ==
Kummerowia striata is native to China, and Japan. The plant is invasive in North America, and it is distributed along the east coast from New York to Florida. It reaches as far west as New Mexico. It was first noticed in Charleston, Virginia in the 1840s. Kummerowia striata is most likely to be found in fields, woods, on the side of roads, or other areas where the ground may have been disturbed. It is uncommon to find a single Kummerowia striata; it is more likely to find a group of them. Kummerowia striata will grow best in moist sandy soil with direct sunlight, but can still grow in other conditions. Kummerowia striata can grow in the 4.5–7.0 pH range, but thrives at 6.0–6.5.

== Uses ==
=== Medical ===
Kummerowia striata is used in traditional Chinese medicine as an anti-inflammatory. The plant promotes blood circulation, removes heat, and detoxes blood. It has been historically used to treat dysentery, sores, abscesses, and to stop diarrhea, among other ailments. The plant can also be used to treat fever, headache, vertigo, and loss of appetite.

=== Agricultural ===
Kummerowia striata is a natural nitrogen fixer, meaning it fixes atmospheric nitrogen out of the air and converts it to plant available nitrogen. Nitrogen is released into the soil when the plant dies. Kummerowia striata can also be used for erosion control.

If planting for Nitrogen enrichment, pair the legume with bunch type grasses. Do not pair with any sod like grasses, they out compete K. striata. Although the plant re-seeds itself, when being used as a source for grazing it must be reseeded manually to keep the plant numbers high enough to provide adequate food for grazers. The best time to plant K. striata is mid spring. When planting K. striata the seed should be soaked in warm water for 12 hours before the seed is planted.

== Food source ==
Kummerowia striata is a food source for numerous species across the food chain from pollinators to herbivores. Most of the pollination is done by bees and they are the only ones who leave the plant intact after they visit. Species of caterpillars, beetles, and moths all eat the leafy parts of this plant at some point in their life stages. The seeds of K. striata are consumed by the Prairie Deer Mouse, gamebirds, and songbirds. Deer, and other herbivores also munch on this plant, choosing to eat the leaves and other foliage.

Kummerowia striata has also been used by farmers for grazing. Grazing or cutting K. striata should occur when the plant is in the half bloom stage, and it is best to leave the bottom three inches of the plant intact. The legume is useful for grazing because of its bloom time, it is in bloom from summer to fall, and is an alternative to the grazing grasses that are only available in the cooler months.

Kummerowia striata is also edible to humans, although it only ranks a two out of five on edibility, based on one scale of edibility. The leaves and seeds of the plant are edible when cooked. The seeds can also be turned into meal and used in baking.
