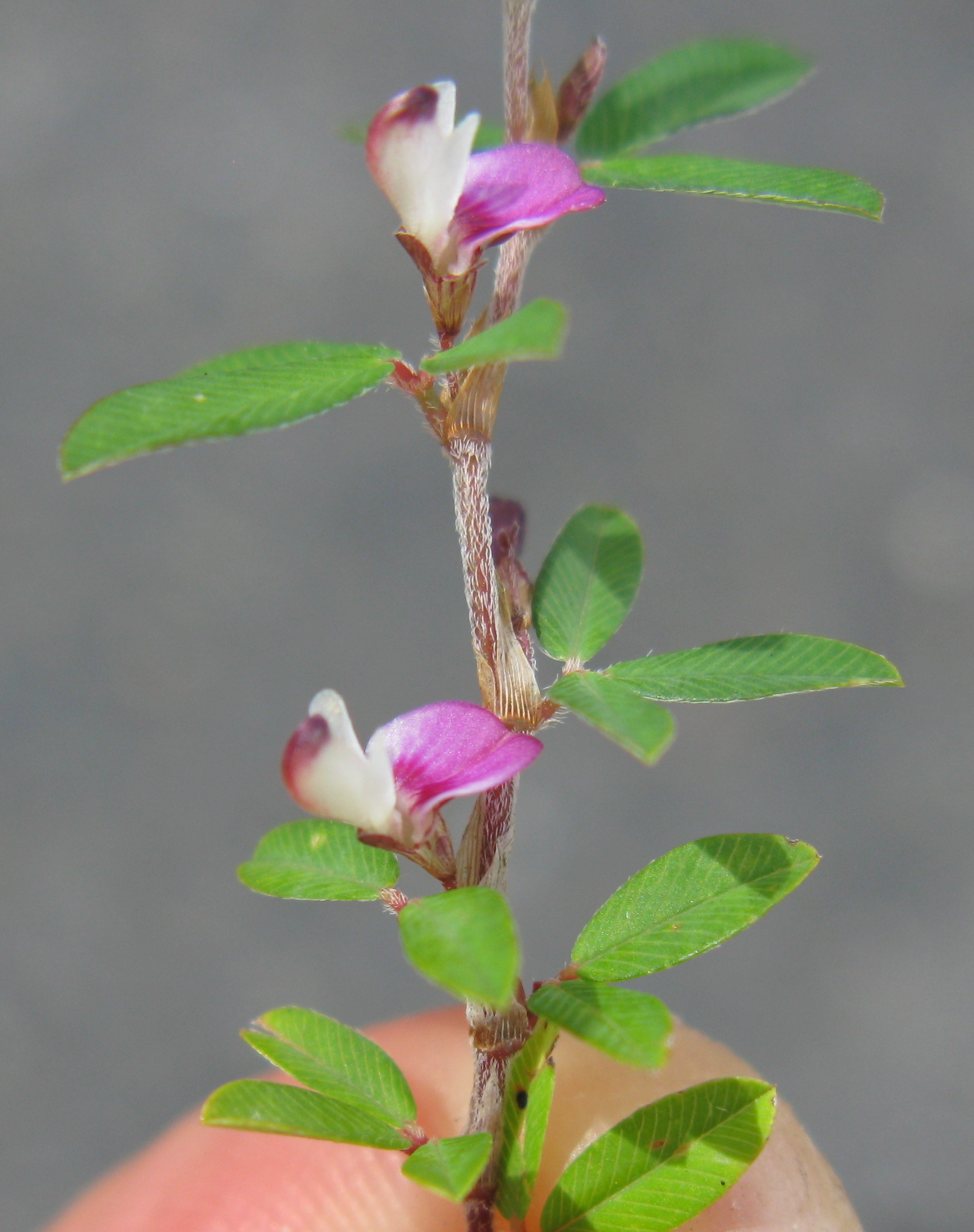
- Kummerowia striata

Scientific classification
- Kingdom: Plantae
- Clade: Embryophytes
- Clade: Tracheophytes
- Clade: Spermatophytes
- Clade: Angiosperms
- Clade: Eudicots
- Clade: Rosids
- Order: Fabales
- Family: Fabaceae
- Subfamily: Faboideae
- Tribe: Desmodieae
- Subtribe: Lespedezinae
- Genus: Kummerowia; Schindl. (1912)

Type species
- Kummerowia striata (Thunb.) Schindl.

Species
- 2, see text

Synonyms
- Lespedeza subg. Microlespedeza Maximowicz 1873; Microlespedeza Makino (1914)

= Kummerowia =

Genus of flowering plants

Kummerowia is a genus of flowering plants in the legume family, Fabaceae. It includes two species native to eastern Asia, ranging from the Russian Far East through China and Japan to Vietnam and Laos. The genus belongs to the subfamily Faboideae. These plants were formerly in genus Lespedeza.

Species:

- Kummerowia stipulacea (Maxim.) Makino - Korean bushclover
- Kummerowia striata (Thunb.) Schindl. - Japanese bushclover
