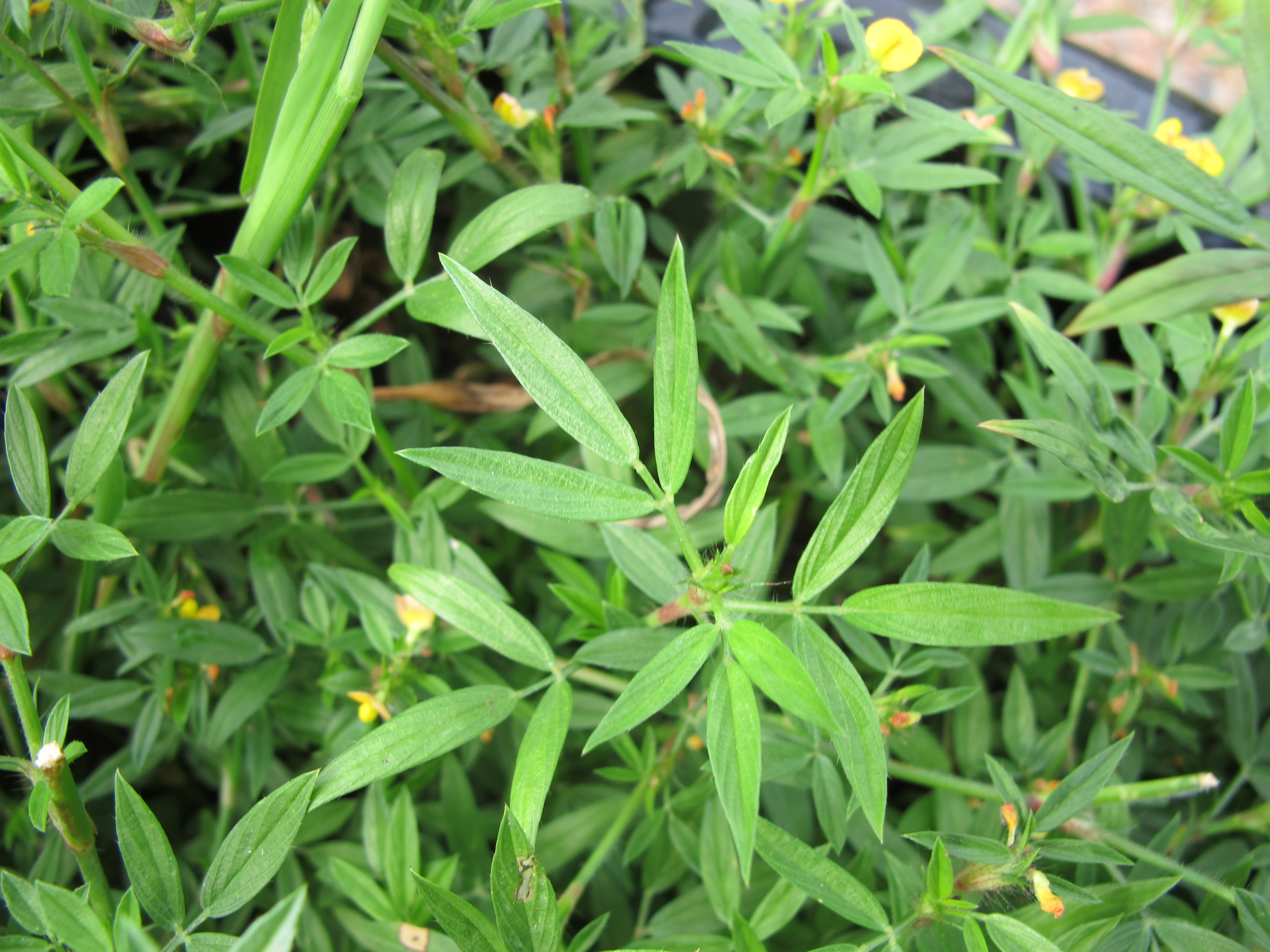
- Habit

Scientific classification
- Kingdom: Plantae
- Clade: Embryophytes
- Clade: Tracheophytes
- Clade: Spermatophytes
- Clade: Angiosperms
- Clade: Eudicots
- Clade: Rosids
- Order: Fabales
- Family: Fabaceae
- Subfamily: Faboideae
- Genus: Stylosanthes
- Species: S. humilis

Binomial name
- Stylosanthes humilis Kunth

Synonyms
- Astyposanthes humilis (Kunth) Herter; Stylosanthes figueroae Mohlenbr.; Stylosanthes sundaica Taub.

= Stylosanthes humilis =

Species of flowering plant

Stylosanthes humilis, the Townsville stylo, is a species of flowering plant in the family Fabaceae, native to the New World Tropics, and widely introduced as a forage to the tropics of Africa, India, Southeast Asia, Malesia, and Australia. A nutritionally valuable forage plant, it was nearly wiped out in Australia in the 1970s by an outbreak of the fungus Colletotrichum gloeosporioides, which causes anthracnose disease.
