= List of hallucinogens =

This is a list of hallucinogens, or psychoactive drugs that produce majorly altered states of consciousness.

== Psychedelics ==
Psychedelics, also known as serotonergic psychedelics or classical hallucinogens, are serotonin 5-HT_{2A} receptor agonists and include the following:

- Tryptamines such as psilocybin, psilocin, dimethyltryptamine (DMT), 5-MeO-DMT, bufotenin, and α-methyltryptamine (AMT)
- Phenethylamines such as mescaline, DOM, 2C-B, 25I-NBOMe, and MDA
- Lysergamides such as LSD, ergine (LSA), ALD-52 (1A-LSD), ETH-LAD, and LSZ
- Others such as efavirenz, glaucine (possibly), IHCH-7113, mefloquine (possibly), MK-212, quipazine, and RH-34

== Dissociatives ==
Dissociatives, also known as dissociative hallucinogens or dissociative anesthetics, are NMDA receptor antagonists and include the following:

- Arylcyclohexylamines such as ketamine (K), phencyclidine (PCP), methoxetamine (MXE), and tiletamine
- Morphinans such as dextromethorphan (DXM), its active metabolite dextrorphan (DXO), and dextrallorphan (DXA)
- Adamantanes such as amantadine and memantine
- Diarylethylamines such as diphenidine, ephenidine, fluorolintane, and methoxphenidine
- Inhalants such as nitrous oxide (N_{2}O) and xenon
- Others such as alkyl nitrites (poppers), aptiganel, dexoxadrol, dizocilpine (MK-801 or MK801), etoxadrol, and selfotel

== Deliriants ==
Deliriants are muscarinic acetylcholine receptor antagonists, also known as antimuscarinics or anticholinergics, and include the following:

- Tropanes such as atropine, scopolamine (hyoscine), and hyoscyamine
- Others such as benztropine, biperidin, dimenhydrinate, diphenhydramine, procyclidine, trihexyphenidyl, and tropicamide

== κ-Opioid receptor agonists ==
κ-Opioid receptor agonists with hallucinogenic effects include the following:

- Salvinoids like salvinorin A (found in Salvia divinorum), 2-MMSB, 2-EMSB, and RB-64 (22-thiocyanatosalvinorin A) (possibly)
- Benzomorphans such as pentazocine, phenazocine, and alazocine
- Morphinans such as levorphanol, levomethorphan, and nalorphine
- Others such as spiradoline, enadoline, and HZ-2

== GABAergics ==
=== GABA_{A} receptor agonists ===
GABA_{A} receptor agonists with hallucinogenic effects include the following:

- Muscimol and ibotenic acid (a prodrug of muscimol), (Note: Ibotenic acid is a glutamate receptor agonist and neurotoxin, whereas muscimol is a GABA_{A} receptor agonist. When ibotenic acid is taken orally in humans however, it is converted 10 to 20% to muscimol with the rest rapidly excreted, and hence acts as a prodrug of muscimol. Little if any unchanged ibotenic acid is thought to reach the brain by this route, though small amounts might still reach the brain and produce neurotoxicity. In any case, ibotenic acid taken orally produces similar psychoactive effects as muscimol in humans with 5- to 10-fold lower potency, including sedation and hallucinogenic effects. As such, oral ibotenic acid is a functional or indirect GABA_{A} receptor agonist and consequent sedative and hallucinogen similarly to muscimol.) the active constituents of Amanita muscaria mushrooms
- Gaboxadol (THIP), a synthetic analogue of muscimol

=== Indirect GABA_{A} receptor agonists ===
==== GABA_{A} receptor positive allosteric modulators ====
- Nonbenzodiazepines or Z drugs such as eszopiclone, zaleplon, zolpidem, and zopiclone

==== GABA reuptake inhibitors ====
- CI-966, a potent GABA transporter 1 (GAT-1) blocker

== Oneirogens ==
Oneirogens, also known as oneirophrenics, have an unknown mechanism of action and include the following:

- β-Carbolines and harmala alkaloids such as harmine, harmaline, tetrahydroharmine (THH), 6-methoxyharmalan, and 6-MeO-THH
- Iboga alkaloids such as ibogaine and noribogaine

== Cannabinoids ==
Cannabinoids with hallucinogenic effects are cannabinoid CB_{1} receptor agonists and include the following:

- Phytocannabinoids such as Δ^{9}-tetrahydrocannabinol (Δ^{9}-THC or simply THC)
- Synthetic cannabinoids such as nabilone, JWH-018, JWH-073, and HU-210

Certain monoacylglycerol lipase (MAGL) inhibitors, which inhibit endocannabinoid metabolism and hence are indirect cannabinoid CB_{1} receptor agonists, also produce partial or full cannabinoid-like discriminative stimulus effects in animal drug discrimination tests. Conversely, fatty acid amide hydrolase (FAAH) inhibitors, which inhibit endocannabinoid inactivation as well, do not substitute for cannabinoids, at least by themselves.

== Other hallucinogens ==
Other hallucinogens that are not known to fall into any of the above groups include the following:

- Aminochromes such as adrenochrome and adrenolutin (disputed/controversial)
- Carbogen, a mixture of carbon dioxide and oxygen gas
- Glaucine, an aporphine alkaloid known to act on serotonin 5-HT_{2} receptors among other actions
- Hallucinogenic bolete mushrooms such as Lanmaoa asiatica (unknown mechanism of action)
- Hallucinogenic fish, which are reported to cause ichthyoallyeinotoxism
- Icelandic hallucinogenic lichen ("rock soup")
- Kambo (sapo), the skin secretions of Phyllomedusa bicolor (giant leaf frog)
- Kykeon, an ancient drink of the Eleusinian Mysteries of unknown identity with possible hallucinogenic effects (disputed/controversial)
- Mad honey (Rhododendron; grayanotoxins), a honey with hallucinogenic effects and substantial toxicity
- Nutmeg, which contains active constituents such as myristicin and elemicin (unknown mechanism of action)
- Sinicuichi (Heimia salicifolia), with possible active constituent of cryogenine (unknown mechanism of action)
- Soma (haoma), an ancient drink made from a plant of unknown identity with possible hallucinogenic effects
- Hallucinogen combinations (e.g., ayahuasca, teotlaqualli)
- Others (e.g., less-well-characterized plant hallucinogens, insect hallucinogens)

== See also ==
- List of drugs
- List of designer drugs
- List of investigational hallucinogens and entactogens
- List of psychoactive drugs
- List of substances used in rituals
- The Encyclopedia of Psychoactive Plants
