= Salvinorin =

Group of chemical compounds

Salvinorins are a group of natural chemical compounds and their structural analogs. Several salvinorins have been isolated from Salvia divinorum. They are classified as diterpenoid furanolactones. Salvinorin A is a hallucinogen with dissociative effects.

Several salvinorins have been isolated and characterized.

Natural salvinorins
Name	Structure	R^{1}	R^{2}	Chemical formula	Molar mass	CAS number	PubChem
Salvinorin A		–OCOCH_{3}	−	C_{23}H_{28}O_{8}	432.46 g·mol^{−1}	83729-01-5	CID 128563 from PubChem
Salvinorin B		–OH	−	C_{21}H_{26}O_{7}	390.43 g·mol^{−1}	92545-30-7	CID 11440685 from PubChem
Salvinorin C		–OCOCH_{3}	–OCOCH_{3}	C_{25}H_{30}O_{9}	475.29 g·mol^{−1}	385785-99-9	–
Salvinorin D		–OH	–OCOCH_{3}	C_{23}H_{28}O_{8}	432.47 g·mol^{−1}	540770-13-6	–
Salvinorin E		–OCOCH_{3}	–OH	C_{23}H_{28}O_{8}	432.47 g·mol^{−1}	540770-14-7	–
Salvinorin F		–H	–OH	C_{21}H_{26}O_{6}	374.43 g·mol^{−1}	540770-15-8	–
Salvinorin G		=O	–OCOCH_{3}	C_{23}H_{26}O_{8}	430.45 g·mol^{−1}	866622-54-0	–
Salvinorin H		–OH	–OH	C_{21}H_{26}O_{7}	390.43 g·mol^{−1}	872004-62-1	–
Salvinorin I		–	–	C_{21}H_{28}O_{7}	392.45 g·mol^{−1}	917951-71-4	–
17α-Salvinorin J		–	–	C_{23}H_{30}O_{8}	434.49 g·mol^{−1}	1157894-83-1	–
17β-Salvinorin J		–	–	C_{23}H_{30}O_{8}	434.49 g·mol^{−1}	1157894-85-3	–

== Occurrence ==
Originally isolated from S. divinorum, salvinorins are also detected in smaller amounts in:

- Salvia recognita (salvinorin A, 212.9 μg/g)
- Salvia absconditiflora (salvinorin A at 51.5 μg/g, and salvinorin B at 402.2 μg/g)
- Salvia glutinosa (salvinorin A, 38.9 μg/g)
- Salvia potentillifolia (salvinorin B, 2352.0 μg/g)
- Salvia adenocaulon (salvinorin B, 768.8 μg/g)

For comparison, the amount of salvinorin A in S. divinorum ranges from 0.89 to 3.70 mg/g. All fractions reported are based on dry mass.

Interestingly, the above reported species are not very closely related to S. divinorum.

== Associated compounds ==
In search for useful biological activity, several synthetic and semi-synthetic analogs have been prepared for study. Semi-synthetic analogs include salvinorin B ethoxymethyl ether (2-EMSB) and salvinorin B methoxymethyl ether (2-MMSB). Fully synthetic analogs include herkinorin.

Several derivates can be conveniently made from salvinorin B. Most derivatives are selective kappa opioid agonists as with salvinorin A, although some are even more potent, with the most potent compound salvinorin B ethoxymethyl ether being ten times stronger than salvinorin A. Some derivatives, such as herkinorin, reduce kappa opioid action and instead act as mu opioid agonists.

22-Thiocyanato-salvinorin A is notable because of its functional selectivity. Salvinorin B methoxymethyl ether is seven times more potent than Salvinorin A at KOPr in GTP-γS assays.

Many other terpenoids have been isolated from Salvia divinorum, including classes named divinatorins and salvinicins. None of these compounds have shown significant (sub-micromolar) affinity at the kappa-opioid receptor, and there is no evidence that they contribute to the plant's psychoactivity.
