= Herkinorin =

Opioid analgesic compound

Clinical data
- Drug class: μ-Opioid receptor agonist; κ-Opioid receptor agonist
- ATC code: None

Legal status
- Legal status: Legal/Uncontrolled

Identifiers
- IUPAC name: methyl (2S,4aR,6aR,7R,9S,10aS,10bR)-9-benzoyloxy-2-(furan-3-yl)-6a,10b-dimethyl-4,10-dioxo-2,4a,5,6,7,8,9,10a-octahydro-1H-benzo[f]isochromene-7-carboxylate
- CAS Number: 862073-77-6
- PubChem CID: 11431898
- ChemSpider: 9606773
- UNII: 5XN29VGR24
- ChEMBL: ChEMBL363324
- CompTox Dashboard (EPA): DTXSID30235444

Chemical and physical data
- Formula: C_{28}H_{30}O_{8}
- Molar mass: 494.540 g·mol^{−1}
- 3D model (JSmol): Interactive image
- SMILES: O=C(OC)[C@H]3[C@@]4(CC[C@H]5C(=O)O[C@H](c1ccoc1)C[C@@]5([C@H]4C(=O)[C@@H](OC(=O)c2ccccc2)C3)C)C
- InChI: InChI=1S/C28H30O8/c1-27-11-9-18-26(32)36-21(17-10-12-34-15-17)14-28(18,2)23(27)22(29)20(13-19(27)25(31)33-3)35-24(30)16-7-5-4-6-8-16/h4-8,10,12,15,18-21,23H,9,11,13-14H2,1-3H3/t18-,19-,20-,21-,23-,27-,28-/m0/s1; Key:PYDQMXRFUVDCHC-XAGHGKQISA-N

Herkinorin is an opioid that is an analogue of the natural product salvinorin A. It was discovered in 2005 during structure-activity relationship studies into neoclerodane diterpenes, the family of chemical compounds of which salvinorin A is a member.

Unlike salvinorin A, which is a selective κ-opioid receptor agonist with no significant μ-opioid receptor affinity, herkinorin is predominantly a μ-opioid receptor agonist. Compared to salvinorin A, herkinorin has 47× lower affinity for κ-opioid receptors (K_{i} = 90 nM vs K_{i} = 1.9 nM), and at least 25× higher affinity for μ-opioid receptors (K_{i} = 12 nM vs K_{i} >1000 nM), where it acts as a full agonist (IC_{50} = 0.5 μM, E_{max} = 130% vs DAMGO). Herkinorin is a semi-synthetic compound, made from salvinorin B, which is most conveniently made from salvinorin A by deacetylation, since, while both salvinorin A and salvinorin B are found in the plant Salvia divinorum, salvinorin A is present in larger quantities.

A study in primates showed it to act peripherally as both a μ- and κ-opioid receptor agonist, with a fast onset of action. The study did not find any evidence of central activity in primates and questions whether herkinorin's effects are due entirely to peripheral binding. Unlike most μ-opioid receptor agonists, herkinorin does not promote the recruitment of β-arrestin 2 to the intracellular domain of the μ-opioid receptor, or induce receptor internalization. This means that herkinorin may not produce tolerance and dependence in the same way as other opioids, although some development of tolerance through other mechanisms has been observed, and some other analogues related to herkinorin can recruit β-arrestins.

== See also ==
- Kurkinorin
- Salvinorin B methoxymethyl ether (2-MMSB)
- Salvinorin B ethoxymethyl ether (2-EMSB)
- RB-64 (22-thiocyanatosalvinorin A)
