= List of substances used in rituals =

This page lists substances used in ritual context.

Psychoactive substances may be illegal to obtain, while non-psychoactive substances are legal, generally.

== Psychoactive use ==
This sections lists entheogens; drugs that are consumed for their intoxicating effect in combination with spiritual practice.

=== Hallucinogens used in rituals ===
This is a list of species and genera that are used as entheogens or are used in an entheogenic concoction (such as ayahuasca). For ritualistic use they may be classified as hallucinogens. The active principles and historical significance of each are also listed to illustrate the requirements necessary to be categorized as an entheogen. The psychoactive substances are usually classified as soft drugs in terms of drug harmfulness.

==== Animal ====
| Vernacular name | Species | Phytochemical(s) | Substance effect class | Regions/Cultures of use |
|---|---|---|---|---|
| Bullet ant venom | Paraponera clavata | Secretion: Poneratoxin | Deliriant | The Satere-Mawe people use bullet ants to get extremely painful stings in their initiation rites twenty times. |
| Colorado River toad bufotoxins | Incilius alvarius | Secretion: 5-MeO-DMT, bufotenin (et al.) | Psychedelic | Bufo alvarious secretion has gained popularity in spiritual retreats. Controversial interpretation of Mesoamerican art. |

==== Mushroom ====
| Vernacular name | Species | Phytochemical(s) | Substance effect class | Regions/Cultures of use |
|---|---|---|---|---|
| Dictyonema huaorani | Dictyonema huaorani | 5-MeO-DMT, DMT, psilocybin | Psychedelic | Confirmed used by shamans. |
| Fly agaric | Amanita muscaria | Muscimol, ibotenic acid | Depressant, and dissociative | Siberian shamans. Scandinavia. Lithuania. |
| Panther cap | Amanita pantherina | Muscimol, ibotenic acid | Depressant, and dissociative | |
| Psilocybin mushroom | Psilocybe spp. (etc.) | Psilocybin and psilocin; baeocystin, norbaeocystin and aeruginascin (in trace amounts or in select species) | Psychedelic | Mazatec |

==== Plant ====
| Vernacular name | Species | Phytochemical(s) | Substance effect class | Regions/Cultures of use |
|---|---|---|---|---|
| Angel's trumpet | Brugmansia spp. | Seed, flower, leaf: Tropane alkaloids | Deliriant | South America, sometimes used as part of ayahuasca. |
| Ayahuasca | Banisteriopsis caapi | Bark: Harmine 0.31-0.84%, tetrahydroharmine, telepathine, dihydroshihunine, 5-MeO-DMT | Psychedelic | South America; people of the Amazon Rainforest. UDV of Brazil and United States. |
| Bolivian torch cactus | Echinopsis lageniformis | Stem: Mescaline | Psychedelic | South America |
| Brosimum acutifolium | | Latex: Bufotenin | Psychedelic | Bufotenin has been identified as a component in the latex of the takini (Brosimum acutifolium) tree, which is used as a psychedelic by South American shamans. |
| Cannabis (and cannabis concentrates) | Cannabis spp. | Flower: Cannabinoids (THC, and CBD) | Psychedelic | Hindu religion in India, Rastafari movements, Cannabis-based religions like First Church of Cannabis or International Church of Cannabis and other various groups (see entheogenic use of cannabis) |
| Chacruna | Psychotria viridis | Leaf: DMT | Psychedelic | UDV of Peru, Ecuador, Colombia, and the Brazilian church. Santo Daime have used it as part of ayahuasca. |
| Chaliponga | Diplopterys cabrerana | Leaf: 5-MeO-DMT, bufotenin, DMT | Psychedelic | Brazil, Colombia, Ecuador, and Peru as part of ayahuasca. |
| Changa | A DMT/MAOI-infused smoking blend | DMT/MAOI | Psychedelic | Changa has gained popularity in spiritual retreats. |
| Christmasvine | Turbina corymbosa | Seed: LSA, isoLSA, lysergol, and turbicoryn; up to 0.03% lysergic acid alkaloids | Psychedelic | Mazatec |
| Harmal (espand, Syrian rue) | Peganum harmala | Seed: Harmaline and other harmala alkaloids | Psychedelic | Iran and the Middle East. |
| Hawaiian baby woodrose | Argyreia nervosa | Seed: 0.325% ergoline derivatives of dry weight. | Psychedelic | Huna shamans used them according to various oral histories. |
| Henbane | Hyoscyamus niger | Seed, flower, leaf: Tropane alkaloids | Deliriant | Ancient Greece and witches of the Middle Ages. |
| Iboga | Tabernanthe iboga | Root bark: Ibogaine | Psychedelic | Bwiti religion of West Central Africa. Used by Western nations to treat opioid addiction. |
| Jimsonweed | Datura stramonium | Seed, flower, leaf: tropane alkaloids: atropine ~0.1; hyoscyamine up to 0.05%; Scopolamine up to 0.3% | Deliriant | Algonquin, Navajo, Cherokee, Luiseño and the indigenous peoples of Marie-Galante used this plant in sacred ceremonies for its hallucinogenic properties. It has also been used by Sadhus of India, and the Táltos of the Magyar (Hungary). |
| Jurema | Mimosa tenuiflora syn. Mimosa hostilis | Root bark: 1-1.7% DMT and yuremamine | Psychedelic | Used by the Jurema Cult (O Culto da Jurema) in the Northeastern Brazil. |
| Labrador tea | Rhododendron spp. | Leaf: Ledol, some grayanotoxins | Deliriant | Caucasian peasants used Rhododendron plants for these effects in shamanistic rituals. |
| Mad honey | Rhododendron ponticum | Nectar: Grayanotoxins | Deliriant | In Nepal, this type of honey is used by the Gurung people both for its supposed medicinal and hallucinogenic properties. |
| Mexican morning glory | Ipomoea tricolor | Seed: Ergoline derivatives LSA and iso-LSA | Psychedelic | Zapotecs |
| Beach moonflower | Ipomoea violacea | Seed: Ergoline derivatives LSA and iso-LSA | Psychedelic | Mazatec |
| Nyakwána | Virola theiodora | Bark, roots, leaves and flowers: DMT, and 5-MeO-DMT | Psychedelic | The Yanomami people use the powdered resin as an entheogen known as nyakwána which is inhaled or "snuffed" into the nasal cavity, it contains a high concentration of 5-MeO-DMT and DMT. |
| Peruvian torch cactus | Echinopsis peruviana | Stem: Mescaline | Psychedelic | Pre-Incan Chavín rituals in Peru. |
| Peyote | Lophophora williamsii | Stem: Mescaline | Psychedelic | Native American Church is known as peyotism. Also used in the Oshara tradition. |
| Red ucuuba | Virola sebifera | Bark: DMT, and 5-MeO-DMT | Psychedelic | The smoke of the inner bark of the tree is used by shamans of the indigenous people of Venezuela in cases of fever conditions, or cooked for driving out evil ghosts. |
| Salvia | Salvia divinorum | Leaf: Salvinorin A and other salvinorins | Psychedelic | Mazatec |
| San Pedro cactus | Trichocereus macrogonus var. pachanoi (syn. Echinopsis pachanoi) | Stem: Mescaline | Psychedelic | South America |
| Vilca | Anadenanthera colubrina | Beans: 5-MeO-DMT. Up to 12.4% bufotenin. DMT | Psychedelic | There have been reports of active use of vilca by Wichi shamans, under the name hatáj. |
| Yopo | Anadenanthera peregrina | Beans: 5-MeO-DMT. Up to 7.4% bufotenin. DMT | Psychedelic | Archaeological evidence of insufflation use within the period 500-1000 AD, in northern Chile, has been reported. Evidence in Puerto Rico (c. A.D. 1150–1250) indicates the preparation of yopo/cohoba snuff in the precolonial Caribbean. |

==== Chemicals ====
Many man-made chemicals with little human history have been recognized to catalyze intense spiritual experiences, and many synthetic entheogens are simply slight modifications of their naturally occurring counterparts. Some synthetic substances like 4-AcO-DMT are thought to be prodrugs that metabolize into psychoactive substances that have been used as entheogens. While synthetic DMT and mescaline are reported to have identical entheogenic qualities as extracted or plant-based sources, the experience may wildly vary due to the lack of numerous psychoactive alkaloids that constitute the material. This is similar to how isolated THC produces very different effects than an extract that retains the many cannabinoids of the plant such as cannabidiol and cannabinol. A pharmaceutical version of the entheogenic brew ayahuasca is called Pharmahuasca.

| Substance | IUPAC name | Substance effect class | Notes |
|---|---|---|---|
| 2C-B | 4-Bromo-2,5-dimethoxyphenylethanamine | Psychedelic | There are claims that 2C-B is used as entheogen by the Sangoma, Nyanga, and Amagqirha people over their traditional plants. It is referred to as Ubulawu Nomathotholo, which roughly translates to "Medicine of the Singing Ancestors". |
| 5-MeO-DMT | 2-(5-Methoxy-1H-indol-3-yl)-N,N-dimethylethan-2-amine | Psychedelic | See species |
| Bufotenin | 3-[2-(Dimethylamino)ethyl]-1H-indol-5-ol | Psychedelic | See species |
| DMT | 2-(1H-Indol-3-yl)-N,N-dimethylethanamine | Psychedelic | See species |
| DPT | N-[2-(1H-indol-3-yl)]ethyl-N-propylpropan-1-amine | Psychedelic | DPT is used as a religious sacrament by the Temple of the True Inner Light who believes that DPT and other psychedelics are physical manifestations of God. |
| Harmaline | 7-methoxy-1-methyl-4,9-dihydro-3H-pyrido[3,4-b]indole | Psychedelic | See Peganum harmala |
| Ibogaine | 12-Methoxyibogamine | Psychedelic | See Tabernanthe iboga |
| Ketamine | | Dissociative | Ketamine psychedelic therapy (KPT) have been used for preparation for death (thanatological, death-rebirth psychotherapy) |
| LSA | (8β)-9,10-didehydro-6-methyl-ergoline-8-carboxamide | Psychedelic | See species |
| Iso-LSA | (8α)-9,10-didehydro-6-methyl-ergoline-8-carboxamide | Psychedelic | See species |
| LSD | (6aR,9R)-N,N-diethyl-7-methyl-4,6,6a,7,8,9-hexahydroindolo[4,3-fg]quinoline-9-carboxamide | Psychedelic | Used by League for Spiritual Discovery (LSD), and the Neo-American Church. |
| MDMA | (RS)-1-(1,3-benzodioxol-5-yl)-N-methylpropan-2-amine | Entactogen | Small doses of MDMA are used as an entheogen to enhance prayer or meditation by some religious practitioners. |
| Muscimol | 5-(Aminomethyl)-isoxazol-3-ol | Deliriant | See Amanita spp. |
| Psilocybin | [3-(2-Dimethylaminoethyl)-1H-indol-4-yl] dihydrogen phosphate | Psychedelic | (See also Psilocybe spp) Prodrug for Psilocin. The Mazatec curandera María Sabina was celebrating a mushroom velada with pills of synthetic psilocybin named Indocybin synthesized by Albert Hofmann. |
| Salvinorin A | methyl (2S,4aR,6aR,7R,9S,10aS,10bR)-9-(acetyloxy)-2-(furan-3-yl)-6a,10b-dimethyl-4,10-dioxo-dodecahydro-1H-naphtho[2,1-c]pyran-7-carboxylate | Psychedelic | See Salvia divinorum |

==== Prodrugs ====
| Substance | IUPAC name | Substance effect class | Notes |
|---|---|---|---|
| 1A-LSD | (6aR,9R)-4-acetyl-N,N-diethyl-7-methyl-4,6,6a,7,8,9-hexahydroindolo[4,3-fg]quinoline-9-carboxamide | Psychedelic | Prodrug (suspected) for LSD |
| 1P-LSD | (6aR,9R)-N,N-Diethyl-7-methyl-4-propanoyl-6,6a,8,9-tetrahydroindolo[4,3-fg]quinoline-9-carboxamide | Psychedelic | Prodrug (suspected) for LSD. In tests on mice 1cP-LSD was found to be an active psychedelic with similar potency to 1P-LSD. |
| 4-AcO-DMT | 3-[2-(Dimethylamino)ethyl]-1H-indol-4-yl acetate | Psychedelic | Prodrug for psilocin (found in psilocybin mushroom, see also psilocybin) |

This page lists non-psychedelic psychoactive substances which are consumed in ritual contexts for their consciousness-altering effects. Non-psychoactive consumption like symbolic ingestion of psychoactive substances is not mentioned here.

=== Non-hallucinogenic substances used in rituals ===
This is a list of psychoactive substances which are consumed in ritual contexts for their consciousness-altering effects. Some of these drugs are classified as hard drugs in terms of drug harmfulness.

==== Plant ====
The plant parts are listed to prevent accidents. For example, kava roots should always be used because the leaves of the plant are known to cause hepatoxicity and death.

| Vernacular name | Species | Phytochemical(s) | Substance effect class | Regions/Cultures of use |
|---|---|---|---|---|
| African dream herb | Entada rheedei | Seed | Oneirogen | The species is employed in African traditional medicine to induce vivid dreams, enabling communication with the spirit world. The inner meat of the seed would be either consumed directly, or the meat would be chopped, dried, mixed with other herbs like tobacco and smoked just before sleep to induce the desired dreams. |
| African dream root | Silene undulata | Root: Possibly triterpenoid saponins | Oneirogen | Xhosa people of South Africa. |
| Aztec tobacco | Nicotiana rustica | Leaf: up to 9% nicotine. MAOI beta-carbolines. | Stimulant | Mapacho (South America) and thuoc lao (thuốc lào) (Vietnam). Nicotiana rustica is used by Amazonian tobacco shamans known as tobaqueros. Nicotiana tabacum juice is sometimes a vernacular added ingredient. |
| Bitter-grass | Calea ternifolia | Leaf: Caleicines and caleochromenes | Oneirogen | The Chontal people of Oaxaca reportedly use the plant, known locally as thle-pela-kano, during divination. |
| Blue water lily | Nymphaea caerulea | Flower: Aporphine, and nuciferine | Depressant | Mayans and the Ancient Egyptians. |
| Chili pepper | Capsicum spp. | Fruit: Capsaicin | Deliriant | "While the Inca may have recognized chili's potent spiritual medicine, they weren't the only culture to do so. Chilies were mixed with tobacco and other plants by shamans and medicine people in pre-Columbian Central America to aid in journeys to the upper and lower worlds on behalf of mankind." |
| Coca, coca tea | Erythroxylaceae spp. | Leaf: 0.3-1.5% cocaine | Stimulant | Coca has been a vital part of the religious cosmology of the Andean peoples of Peru, Bolivia, Ecuador, Colombia, northern Argentina, and Chile from the pre-Inca period through the present. In addition, coca use in shamanic rituals is well documented wherever local native populations have cultivated the plant. For example, the Tairona people of Colombia's Sierra Nevada de Santa Marta use to chew the plant before engaging in extended meditation and prayer. |
| Cocoa | Theobroma cacao | Bean: Theobromine, small amount of MAOIs | Stimulant | Ritualistic practices originated among the Olmec, Maya and Mexica (Aztec). |
| Coffee | Coffea spp. | Seed: caffeine 0.06-3.2% | Stimulant | The earliest credible evidence of either coffee drinking or knowledge of the coffee tree appears in the middle of the 15th century, in Yemen's Sufi monasteries. The Sufi monks drank coffee as an aid to concentration and even spiritual intoxication when they chanted the name of God. |
| Ilex guayusa | Ilex guayusa | Leaves: 1.73–3.48 % caffeine. Theanine | Stimulant | A ritual use by the Quechua people involves drinking guayusa infusion to have foretelling dreams for successful hunting expeditions. Ilex guayusa is used in ayahuasca admixtures for its healing powers. |
| Kava | Piper methysticum | Root: 3-20% kavalactones | Depressant | Kava cultures are the religious and cultural traditions of western Oceania which consume kava. |
| Khat | Catha edulis | Leaf: cathine up to 14% | Stimulant | For centuries, religious leaders have consumed the leaves to stay awake during long nights of prayer. |
| Kratom | Mitragyna speciosa | Leaves: Opioids (1–6% mitragynine, 0.01–0.04% 7-hydroxymitragynine) | Depressant | In Thailand, kratom was "used as a snack to receive guests and was part of the ritual worship of ancestors and gods." (Saingam et al.) |
| Opium, Opium poppy | Papaver somniferum | Latex exudate: morphine 0.3–25% and codeine 0.5–4% | Depressant | From the earliest finds, opium appears to have had ritual significance, and anthropologists have speculated ancient priests may have used the drug as a proof of healing power. In Egypt, the use of opium was generally restricted to priests, magicians, and warriors, its invention is credited to Thoth, and it was said to have been given by Isis to Ra as treatment for a headache. A figure of the Minoan "goddess of the narcotics", wearing a crown of three opium poppies, BCE, was recovered from the Sanctuary of Gazi, Crete, together with a simple smoking apparatus. The Greek gods Hypnos (Sleep), Nyx (Night), and Thanatos (Death) were depicted wreathed in poppies or holding them. Poppies also frequently adorned statues of Apollo, Asklepios, Pluto, Demeter, Aphrodite, Kybele and Isis, symbolizing nocturnal oblivion. The opium poppy was a magical ritual plant among the Germanic tribes. |
| Pituri | Duboisia hopwoodii, Duboisia myoporoides, Nicotiana spp. | Nicotine, tropane alkaloids | Stimulant | Pituri, also known as mingkulpa, is a mixture of leaves and wood ash traditionally chewed as a stimulant (or, after extended use, a depressant) by Aboriginal Australians widely across the continent. |
| Tea | Camellia sinensis | Leaf: caffeine 0.4‍–‍9.3%; theanine 0.5‍–‍1.4%; theobromine 0.05‍–‍0.1% | Stimulant | See tea culture. For example, East Asian tea ceremony is a ritualized practice of making and serving tea (茶 cha) in East Asia practiced in the Sinosphere. Tea has been drunk by Buddhist monks since the Sui Dynasty (589–618 BC) to maintain a state of "mindful alertness" during long periods of meditation. Tea ceremonies have been ritualized for centuries. |

===== Alcohol =====
| Vernacular name | Species | Phytochemical(s) | Substance effect class | Regions/Cultures of use |
|---|---|---|---|---|
| Alcoholic beverages | Yeast byproduct: Alcohol fermented species | Alcohol | Depressant | Christian views on alcohol encompass a range of perspectives regarding the consumption of alcoholic beverages, with significant emphasis on moderation rather than total abstinence. The moderationist position is held by Roman Catholics and Eastern Orthodox, and within Protestantism, it is accepted by Anglicans, Lutherans and many Reformed churches. Moderationism is also accepted by Jehovah's Witnesses. In the Vodou faith of Haiti, alcoholic drinks such as rum are consumed to be able to allow spirits called "lwa" to enter one's body and help them find the motivation for or strength to survive everyday struggles or life. In Vajrayana Buddhism, particularly in Tibetan Buddhist practices, alcohol may be used during specific rituals, such as the Ganachakra feast. This ritual involves the consumption of alcohol in a controlled manner, symbolizing the transformation of negative emotions and attachments into wisdom and compassion. In Taoist rituals and practices, alcohol also plays a role as an offering and a means of connecting with the divine. An alcoholic beverage is often used in religious ceremonies and as an offering to the ancestors. The use of alcohol in Taoist rituals can symbolize purification, blessings, and the establishment of a sacred space. In these instances, the consumption of alcohol is done in a controlled and mindful manner, reflecting the Taoist emphasis on balance and harmony. Some Hindu denominations, like the Aghori, incorporate alcohol into their rituals and practices. The Maya ritually administered alcohol enemas as an entheogen, sometimes adding other psychoactive substances, seeking to reach a state of ecstasy. Syringes of gourd and clay were used to inject the fluid. Alcohol replaced peyote as Native Americans' psychoactive agent of choice in rituals when peyote was outlawed. |
| Balché | | Alcohol | Depressant | The Maya also consumed an alcoholic beverage called balché, which is an infusion of the bark of Lonchocarpus longistylus (see page Lonchocarpus violaceus) mixed with honey from bees fed on a type of morning glory with a high ergine content. |
| Beer | Yeast byproduct: Barley ( Liquid Gold spp.) (fermented) | Alcohol | Depressant | The earliest archaeological evidence of fermentation consists of 13,000-year-old residues of a beer with the consistency of gruel, used by the semi-nomadic Natufians for ritual feasting, at the Raqefet Cave in the Carmel Mountains near Haifa in Israel. |
| Chicha | Yeast byproduct: Corn (Zea mays), fermented | Alcohol | Depressant | The corn beer Chicha de jora was once a sacred drink of the Incas, often reserved for the most cherished of ceremonies. |
| Kosher wine | Yeast byproduct: Alcohol fermented species | Alcohol | Depressant | During the Jewish holiday of Purim, Jews are obligated to drink until their judgmental abilities become impaired. However, Purim has more of a national than a religious character. |
| Mead | | Alcohol | Depressant | In the Norse religion the drinking of ales and meads was important in several seasonal religious festivals such as Yule and Midsummer as well as more common festivities like wakes, christenings and ritual sacrifices called Blóts. |
| Pulque | | Alcohol | Depressant | Before the Spanish colonization of the Americas, pulque was used for religious ceremonies in Mesoamerica, but after the Spanish conquest, pulque consumption lost its ritual meanings. |
| Rakia | Collective term for fruit spirits (or fruit brandy) popular in the Balkans. | Alcohol | Depressant | Although wine is the essential part of the Eucharist rite in the Eastern Orthodox and Roman Catholic churches in the region, rakia has found uses in certain religious and related rituals across the Balkans. It is also used as a sacramental element in Bektashi and Alevi Jem ceremonies, where it is not considered alcoholic and is referred to as "dem". |
| Sake | | Alcohol | Depressant | Sake is often consumed as part of Shinto purification rituals. Sakes served to gods as offerings prior to drinking are called Omiki (お神酒). People drink Omiki with gods to communicate with them and to solicit rich harvests the following year. |
| Tesgüino | | Alcohol | Depressant | Tesguino is a corn beer made by the Tarahumara people of the Sierra Madre Occidental in Mexico. It is brewed for local celebrations related to Holy Week. For the Tarahumara, the beer is an elixir for healing, a barter item and is considered a sacred beverage. The Tarahumara people gather every year during Easter week (semana santa) and drink large amounts of Tesgüino together while following rituals. According to the anthropologist Bill Merrill of the Smithsonian Institution, the sacred drink chases large souls from the persons who drink it, "and so when people get drunk that's why they act like children [...] because the souls that are controlling their actions are the little souls, like little children". |
| Wine | Yeast byproduct: Grape (Vitis spp.) (fermented) | Alcohol | Depressant | Wine was used in rituals and worshipped by the Egyptians and the Greeks, specifically in worship of Dionysus. The Thelema ceremony calls for five officers: a Priest, a Priestess, a Deacon, and two adult acolytes, called "the Children". The end of the ritual culminates in the consummation of the eucharist, consisting of a goblet of wine and a Cake of Light, after which the congregant proclaims "There is no part of me that is not of the gods!" |

==== Chemicals ====
| Substance | IUPAC name | Substance effect class | Notes |
|---|---|---|---|
| Alcohol | Ethanol | Depressant | See Vitis spp. |
| Caffeine | 1,3,7-Trimethylpurine-2,6-dione | Stimulant | See Coffea |
| Cathine | (1S,2S)-2-amino-1-phenylpropan-1-ol | Stimulant | See Catha edulis |
| Cocaine | Methyl (1R,2R,3S,5S)-3-(benzoyloxy)-8-methyl-8-azabicyclo[3.2.1]octane-2-carboxylate | Stimulant | Coca addicts ingest between 60 and 80 milligrams of cocaine each time they chew the leaves according to United Nations Office on Drugs and Crime (UNODC). However, other sources claim that the coca leaf, when consumed in its natural form or as coca tea, does not induce a physiological or psychological dependence, nor does abstinence after long-term use produce symptoms typical for substance addiction withdrawal syndromes. See also Erythroxylum coca, and Erythroxylum novogranatense spp. |
| Codeine | (5α,6α)-7,8-didehydro-4,5-epoxy-3-methoxy-17-methylmorphinan-6-ol | Depressant | Prodrug for morphine |
| Kavalactones | | Depressant | See Piper methysticum |
| Morphine | (4R,4aR,7S,7aR,12bS)-3-Methyl-2,3,4,4a,7,7a-hexahydro-1H-4,12-methanobenzofuro[3,2-e]isoquinoline-7,9-diol | Depressant | See Papaver somniferum |

=== Poly drug use ===
| Vernacular name | Species | Phytochemical(s) | Substance effect class | Regions/Cultures of use |
|---|---|---|---|---|
| Alcohol + vilca | Anadenanthera colubrina | Beans: 5-MeO-DMT. Up to 12.4% bufotenin. DMT | Psychedelic + depressant | Between 2013 and 2017, archaeological excavations at the Quilcapampa site in southern Peru, found that the Wari used seeds from the vilca tree and combined the hallucinogenic drug with chicha, or beer made from the molle tree. |
| Psilocybin mushroom + cocoa | Theobroma cacao | Bean: Theobromine, small amount of MAOIs | Stimulant | Aztecs combined cacao with psilocybin mushrooms to yield a polysubstance combination |

=== Alternative medicine ===
==== Animal ====
| Vernacular name | Species | Phytochemical(s) | Substance effect class | Regions/Cultures of use |
|---|---|---|---|---|
| Kambo (or sapo) | Phyllomedusa bicolor | Secretion: Opioid peptides (deltorphin, deltorphin I, deltorphin II and dermorphin). | Depressant | Increasing popularity in cleansing rituals and depression treatment. |

=== Complements to psychoactive substances ===
| Vernacular name | Species | Phytochemical(s) | Substance effect class | Regions/Cultures of use |
|---|---|---|---|---|
| Aztec tobacco | Nicotiana rustica | Incense | | Nicotiana rustica is used—as incense–in association with Ayahuasca ritual in some parts of the Amazon. |

== Sober use ==
=== Non-psychoactive substances ===
| Vernacular name | Species | Use | Regions/Cultures of use |
|---|---|---|---|
| Chrism, also called myrrh, and holy anointing oil | | Element in anointing of the sick, baptism, and priesthood blessing | Sacramental olive oil. Use in the Roman Catholic Church: Anointing of the Sick in the Catholic Church, and Oil of Catechumens. Use by the Church of Jesus Christ of Latter-day Saints: Priesthood blessing |
| Copal | Bursera fagaroides | Religious use of incense | Used by Aztec, and Maya, in ritual ceremonies. |
| Holy water | | Element in baptism, exorcism, and Epiphany | Exorcism in the Catholic Church, holy water in Eastern Christianity, holy water in the Ethiopian Orthodox Tewahedo Church Holy water is important to the Ethiopian Orthodox Tewahedo Church and regarded as healing from demonic possession and for treating sick people, particularly in cases of mental illness. It can be consumed or poured over someone supposed to be afflicted by harmful things. Most Mahayana Buddhists typically recite sutras or various mantras (typically that of the bodhisattva Avalokitesvara for example) numerous times over the water, which is then either consumed or is used to bless homes afterwards. In Vajrayana Buddhism, a Bumpa, a ritual object, is one of the Ashtamangala, used for storing sacred water sometimes, symbolizing wisdom and long life. |
| Liquids | | Libation | The drink offering (Hebrew ְנֶסֶך, nesekh) was a form of libation forming one of the sacrifices and offerings of the Law of Moses. |
| Sacramental bread, sacramental wine | | Elements of the Eucharist | |
| White Sage | Salvia apiana | Ritual purification | Different parts of the plant are used in ritual purification by several Native American cultures. |

=== Psychoactive substances ===
Shown in the table below, Aztec tobacco, morning glories, and Syrian rue (also listed in the § Psychoactive use table), and cacao beans are (mildly) psychoactive when consumed.

==== Psychedelic substances used in sober rituals ====
===== Flora =====
| Vernacular name | Species | Use | Regions/Cultures of use |
|---|---|---|---|
| Morning glory | T. corymbosa, and Ipomoea violacea | Numerology | "indigenous ritual use indicates dose levels for T. corymbosa, and I. violacea which are far lower than that perceived as necessary to effect hallucinosis in members of modern Western cultures. In Mexico, the only place in the world where the ingestion of morning glory seeds has an established tradition of shamanic usage, a hallucinogenic dose is said to be only thirteen seeds, a ritual amount based on religious numerology rather than chemical analysis." |
| Syrian rue | Peganum harmala | Incense | "In the Himalayas, shamans use syrian rue seeds as a magical incense, inhaling it to enter a trance state in which they can engage in sexual intercourse with divining goddesses, who are said to give them information and great healing powers" |

==== Non-psychedelic substances used in sober rituals ====
| Vernacular name | Species | Use | Regions/Cultures of use |
|---|---|---|---|
| Cacao bean | Theobroma cacao | Sacrifice | |
| Coca leaves | | Sacrifice | Sometimes coca leaves from the plant were used as offerings in rituals. Due to the nature of politics and religion in the Inca Empire, wealthy inhabitants handed out coca leaves during ritual ceremonies. |

===== Alcohol =====
| Vernacular name | Species | Use | Regions/Cultures of use |
|---|---|---|---|
| Alcohol (liquor), and tobacco | | Ofrenda | An ofrenda (Spanish: "offering") is the offering placed in a home altar during the annual and traditionally Mexican Día de los Muertos celebration. An ofrenda, which may be quite large and elaborate, is usually created by the family members of a person who has died and is intended to welcome the deceased to the altar setting. For deceased adults, the ofrenda might include a bottle or poured shot glasses of tequila or mezcal. |
| Alcohol (liquor), and tobacco | | Veneration | Maximón is venerated in the form of an effigy or cult image. Worship varies greatly by location. In Santiago Atitlán, Maximón's effigy resides in a different household every year. His image is normally only taken out of this house during Holy Week, whereafter it will change households, but is on display year-round due to the popularity of pilgrimages. The effigy has special attendants that stay by the altar year-round, drinking and smoking alongside it. They deliver offerings from the public to the image. Popular offerings include money, tobacco, and moonshine. |
| Kosher wine | | Element in Kiddush | |

== See also ==
- Entheogenic drugs and the archaeological record
- Ethnobotany
- God in a Pill?
- List of Acacia species known to contain psychoactive alkaloids
- List of hallucinogens
- List of plants used for smoking
- List of psychoactive drugs
- Dimethyltryptamine
- Psilocybin mushrooms
- Psychoactive cacti
- Psychoactive plant
- The Encyclopedia of Psychoactive Plants
- Pharmacotheon (1993/1996)
