= Nalfurafine =

Antipruritic drug

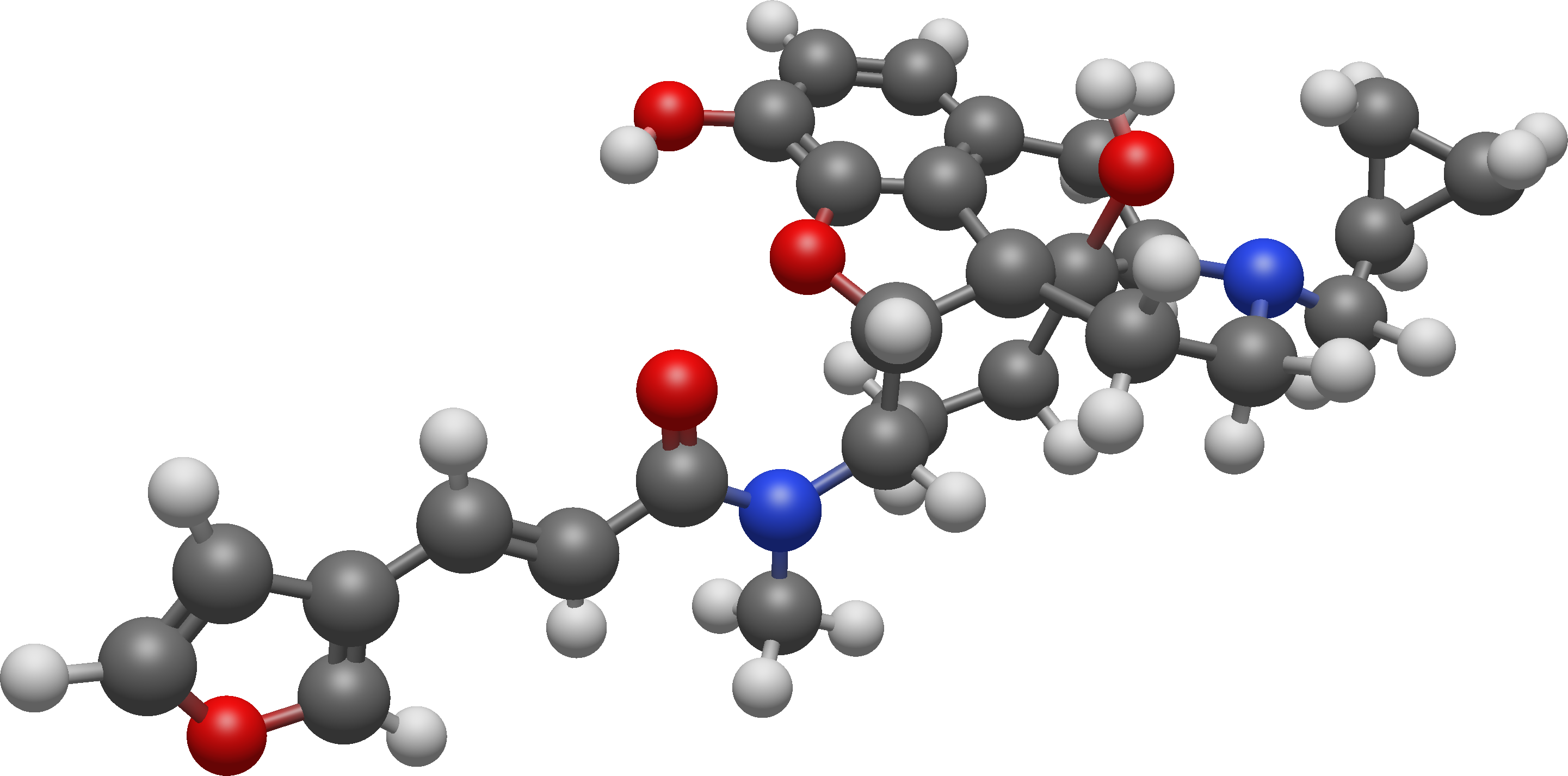

Clinical data
- Other names: TRK-820, AC-820, MT-9938
- AHFS/Drugs.com: International Drug Names
- Routes of administration: Intravenous
- Drug class: κ-Opioid receptor agonist
- ATC code: V03AX02 (WHO)

Legal status
- Legal status: In general: ℞ (Prescription only)

Pharmacokinetic data
- Elimination half-life: 14 hours (acute); 25–28 hours (chronic)

Identifiers
- IUPAC name: (2E)-N-[(5α,6β)-17-(Cyclopropylmethyl)-3,14-dihydroxy-4,5-epoxymorphinan-6-yl]-3-(3-furyl)-N-methylacrylamide
- CAS Number: 152657-84-6; HCl: 152658-17-8
- PubChem CID: 6445230
- IUPHAR/BPS: 1651
- ChemSpider: 4949003
- UNII: XC41AVD567; HCl: 25CC4N0P8J
- ChEMBL: ChEMBL267495
- PDB ligand: IVB (PDBe, RCSB PDB)
- CompTox Dashboard (EPA): DTXSID70905119

Chemical and physical data
- Formula: C_{28}H_{32}N_{2}O_{5}
- Molar mass: 476.573 g·mol^{−1}
- 3D model (JSmol): Interactive image
- SMILES: CN([C@@H]1CC[C@]2([C@H]3CC4=C5[C@]2([C@H]1OC5=C(C=C4)O)CCN3CC6CC6)O)C(=O)/C=C/C7=COC=C7
- InChI: InChI=1S/C28H32N2O5/c1-29(23(32)7-4-18-9-13-34-16-18)20-8-10-28(33)22-14-19-5-6-21(31)25-24(19)27(28,26(20)35-25)11-12-30(22)15-17-2-3-17/h4-7,9,13,16-17,20,22,26,31,33H,2-3,8,10-12,14-15H2,1H3/b7-4+/t20-,22-,26+,27+,28-/m1/s1; Key:XGZZHZMWIXFATA-UEZBDDGYSA-N

Nalfurafine (INN, USAN; brand name Remitch; former developmental code names TRK-820, AC-820, MT-9938) is an antipruritic (anti-itch drug) that is marketed in Japan for the treatment of uremic pruritus in individuals with chronic kidney disease undergoing hemodialysis. It activates the κ-opioid receptor (KOR) and is potent, selective, and centrally active. It was the first selective KOR agonist approved for clinical use. It has also been dubiously referred to as the "first non-narcotic opioid drug" in history.

== History ==
Nalfurafine was derived from structural modification of the opioid antagonist naltrexone. It was first synthesized and characterized in 1998, and was approved for clinical use in Japan as an intravenous drug under the brand name Remitch in 2009. The developer of nalfurafine also sought approval in Europe under the brand name Winfuran, but the marketing authorisation application was declined by the European Medicines Agency. The drug was originally developed as an analgesic in surgery, but while effective in animal models of nociception, it was repurposed as an antipruritic at lower treatment doses due to an apparently unacceptable incidence of sedative effects in humans. As of 2015, nalfurafine is also in clinical trials for the treatment of cholestatic pruritus in Japan for patients with chronic liver disease, and for the treatment of uremic pruritus in the United States.

== Effects ==
Unlike other KOR agonists, nalfurafine does not produce hallucinogenic effects in humans. Single intramuscular injections of up to 30 μg are well tolerated by humans, whereas a dose of 40 μg produced "moderate behavioral/psychological side effects" (possibly referring to sedation), though apparently did not produce any psychotomimetic or dysphoric effects. In rodents, a low dose of nalfurafine (10–40 μg/kg) was found not to produce conditioned place preference or aversion, though a high dose (80 μg/kg) did induce significant place aversion. The most common side effect of low-dose nalfurafine seen in clinical trials was insomnia (observed in 10–15% of patients), with few other adverse effects observed. In addition, tolerance to the antipruritic effects of nalfurafine was not found after treatment of patients with the drug for one year, and nalfurafine has shown no evidence of either physical nor psychological dependence in humans. The drug also shows lower evidence of tolerance for effects such as analgesia and sedation in animals relative to other KOR agonists. In animals, nalfurafine produces anti-scratch, antinociceptive, sedative, and diuretic effects.

== Mechanism of action ==
Nalfurafine is an orally active, centrally acting, highly potent, selective full agonist of the κ-opioid receptor (KOR) (K_{i} = 75 pM; EC_{50} = 25 pM). As touched on above, nalfurafine shows atypical properties as a KOR agonist relative to other drugs. Notably, it does not completely substitute for the prototypical KOR agonist U-50488 in rodents, indicating qualitative differences in the discriminative effects of the two compounds. Moreover, unlike U-50488, it produces neither conditioned place aversion or preference in rodents. The drug is a 4,5-epoxymorphinan derivative, and is structurally unique relative to other KOR agonists. Nalfurafine may be a biased agonist of the KOR or a KOR subtype-selective agonist. Indeed, it has been found to act as a biased agonist of the KOR, preferring activation of β-arrestin signaling in vitro, but paradoxically, β-arrestin appears to be responsible for KOR agonist-induced aversion, and nalfurafine furthermore shows paradoxical effects in vivo that are not consistent with its in vitro profile. As such, more research is needed to clarify the distinct mechanisms and effects of this drug.

Nalfurafine has been found in vitro to bind to the μ-opioid receptor and to possess weak partial agonist activity at this site, albeit with much lower affinity relative to the KOR. However, in vivo, nalfurafine has shown no indications of MOR agonism or antagonism in animals or humans, including no evidence of rewarding or reinforcing effects or physical dependence.

== Research ==
Nalfurafine has been found to be effective in a variety of animal models relevant to drug abuse, addiction, and dependence, and may represent a novel potential treatment for these maladies. In rodents, the drug attenuates the discriminative and rewarding effects of cocaine and the rewarding and locomotor effects of morphine, and diminishes the mecamylamine-precipitated aversive effect of nicotine withdrawal.

== See also ==
- κ-Opioid receptor agonist
- Asimadoline
- Butorphanol
- Difelikefalin
- Nalbuphine
- Nalmefene
- Naltriben
- Noribogaine
- RB-64
- Salvinorin A
