= Salvinorin A =

Chemical compound

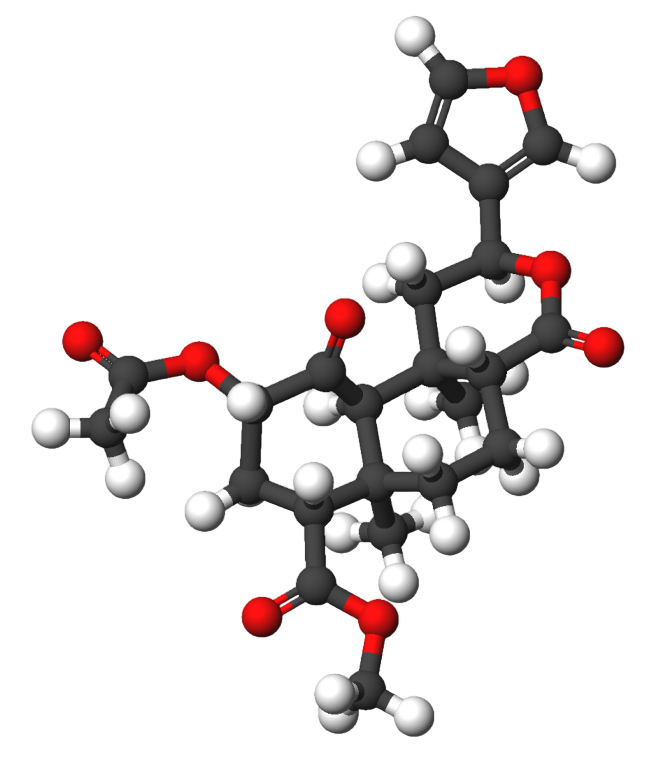

Clinical data
- Other names: Divinorin A
- Routes of administration: Inhalation (e.g., smoking), buccal, insufflation
- Drug class: κ-Opioid receptor agonist; Hallucinogen
- ATC code: None

Legal status
- Legal status: AU: S9 (Prohibited substance); BR: Class F2 (Prohibited psychotropics); CA: Schedule IV; UK: Under Psychoactive Substances Act; Uncontrolled (though Salvia divinorum is controlled in some parts of the world, such as in certain states in the US)

Pharmacokinetic data
- Bioavailability: Oral: inactive
- Protein binding: 83%
- Metabolism: Deacetylation (esterases, CYP450s), delactonation (lactonase), glucuronidation (UGT2B7)
- Metabolites: • Salvinorin B • Salvinorin A glucuronide • Others
- Onset of action: Smoking: <30 seconds Buccal: 10–15 minutes
- Elimination half-life: 50 minutes
- Duration of action: Smoking: 20–30 minutes Buccal: ~1 hour
- Excretion: Urine, bile

Identifiers
- IUPAC name: methyl (2S,4aR,6aR,7R,9S,10aS,10bR)-9-(acetyloxy)-2-(furan-3-yl)-6a,10b-dimethyl-4,10-dioxo-dodecahydro-1H-naphtho[2,1-c]pyran-7-carboxylate
- CAS Number: 83729-01-5
- PubChem CID: 128563
- IUPHAR/BPS: 1666
- ChemSpider: 113947
- UNII: T56W91NG6J
- KEGG: C20196
- ChEBI: CHEBI:67900
- ChEMBL: ChEMBL445332
- CompTox Dashboard (EPA): DTXSID80232584
- ECHA InfoCard: 100.215.796

Chemical and physical data
- Formula: C_{23}H_{28}O_{8}
- Molar mass: 432.469 g·mol^{−1}
- 3D model (JSmol): Interactive image
- Specific rotation: [α]_{D} = -45.3° at 22 °C/ (c = 8.530 CHCl_{3}); [α]_{D} = -41° at 25 °C (c = 1 in CHCl_{3})
- Melting point: 238 to 240 °C (460 to 464 °F) (also reported 242–244 °C)
- Boiling point: 760.2 °C (1,400.4 °F)
- Solubility in water: 25.07 mg/L at 25 °C (water, est) mg/mL (20 °C)
- SMILES: O=C(OC)[C@H]2[C@@]3(CC[C@H]4C(=O)O[C@H](c1ccoc1)C[C@@]4([C@H]3C(=O)[C@@H](OC(=O)C)C2)C)C
- InChI: InChI=1S/C23H28O8/c1-12(24)30-16-9-15(20(26)28-4)22(2)7-5-14-21(27)31-17(13-6-8-29-11-13)10-23(14,3)19(22)18(16)25/h6,8,11,14-17,19H,5,7,9-10H2,1-4H3/t14-,15-,16-,17-,19-,22-,23-/m0/s1; Key:OBSYBRPAKCASQB-AGQYDFLVSA-N

Salvinorin A is a κ-opioid receptor agonist and hallucinogen and is the main active constituent in Salvia divinorum (also known as diviner's sage, ska maría pastora, or simply salvia). It is usually taken via inhalation such as smoking or via oral administration.

The drug is structurally distinct from other naturally occurring hallucinogens (such as dimethyltryptamine (DMT), psilocybin, ergine (LSA), and mescaline), for instance containing no nitrogen atoms; hence, it is not an alkaloid (and cannot be rendered as a salt), but rather is a terpenoid. It also differs in subjective experience, compared to other hallucinogens, and has been described as having strong dissociative-esque effects.

Salvinorin A can produce psychoactive experiences in humans with a typical duration of action being several minutes to an hour or so, depending on the route of administration.

Salvinorin A is found with several other structurally related salvinorins. Salvinorin is a trans-neoclerodane diterpenoid. It is the first known compound acting as a κ-opioid receptor agonist that is not an alkaloid.

== Use and effects ==
Salvinorin A is active at doses as low as 200 μg. It has only been administered to humans in a few studies, one showing that its effects peaked at about 2 minutes, that its subjective effects may overlap with those of serotonergic psychedelics, and that it temporarily impairs recall and recognition memory. Like most other agonists of KOR, salvinorin A produces sedation, psychotomimesis, dysphoria, anhedonia, and depression.

== Interactions ==
Naltrexone, a non-selective opioid receptor antagonist including of the κ-opioid receptor (KOR), blocks the hallucinogenic and physiological effects of salvinorin A in humans. Conversely, the serotonin 5-HT_{2A} receptor antagonist ketanserin was ineffective.

== Pharmacology ==
=== Pharmacodynamics ===
Research has shown that salvinorin A is a potent κ-opioid receptor (KOR) agonist (K_{i} = 2.4 nM, EC_{50} = 1.8 nM). It has a high affinity for the receptor, indicated by the low dissociation constant of 1.0 nanomolar (nM). It shows atypical properties as an agonist of the KOR relative to other KOR agonists. In addition to its KOR agonism, salvinorin A has been found to act as a dopamine D_{2} receptor partial agonist, with an affinity of 5–10 nM, an intrinsic activity of 40–60%, and an EC_{50} of 48 nM. As such, the dopamine D_{2} receptor might also play a role in its effects.

Salvinorin A has no action at the 5-HT_{2A} serotonin receptor, the principal molecular target responsible for the actions of 'classical' psychedelics such as LSD and mescaline. Salvinorin A has also been shown to have effect on cannabinoid CB1 receptors. It significantly increases prolactin and inconsistently increases cortisol. It causes dysphoria by stopping release of dopamine in the striatum. Salvinorin A increases activity of DAT while decreasing activity of SERT.

Salvinorin A is capable of inhibiting excess intestinal motility (e.g. diarrhea), through its potent κ-opioid-activating effects. The mechanism of action for salvinorin A on ileal tissue has been described as 'prejunctional', as it was able to modify electrically induced contractions, but not those of exogenous acetylcholine. A pharmacologically important aspect of the contraction-reducing properties of ingested salvinorin A on gut tissue is that it is only pharmacologically active on inflamed and not normal tissue, thus reducing possible side-effects.

=== Pharmacokinetics ===
Salvinorin A is effectively deactivated by the gastrointestinal system, so alternative routes of administration must be used for better absorption. It is absorbed by oral mucosa. It has a half-life of around 8 minutes in non-human primates.

== Chemistry ==
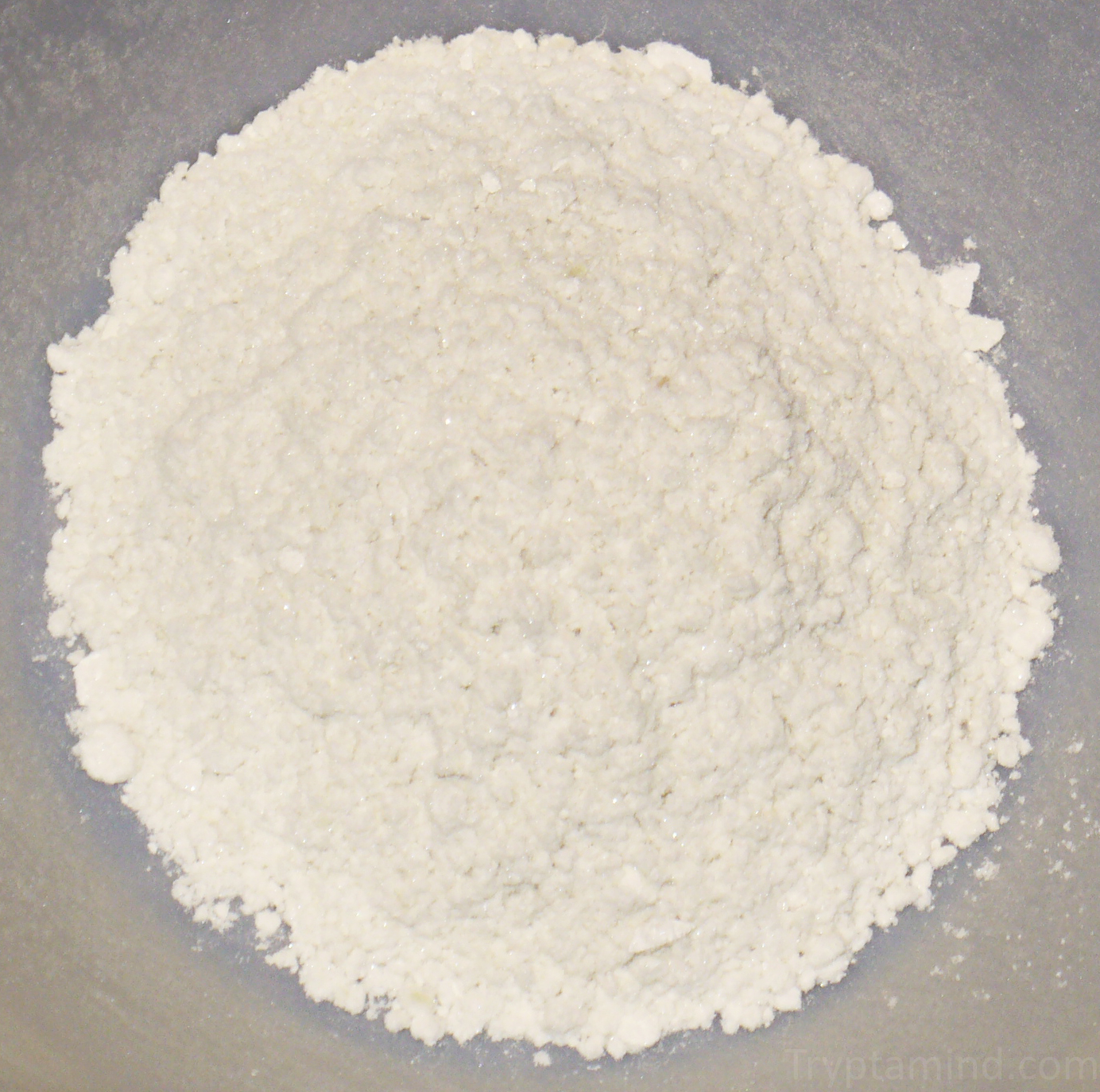
Salvinorin A

Salvinorin A is a trans-neoclerodane diterpenoid with the chemical formula C_{23}H_{28}O_{8}. Unlike other known opioid-receptor ligands, salvinorin A is not an alkaloid, as it does not contain a nitrogen atom.

=== Solubility ===
Salvinorin A is soluble in organic solvents such as ethanol and acetone, but not especially so in water.

=== Chemical synthesis ===
The chemical synthesis of salvinorin A has been described. A total asymmetric synthesis of salvinorin A, which relies on a transannular Michael reaction cascade to construct the ring system, was achieved as a 4.5% overall yield over 30 steps, then revised using 24 steps to yield salvinorin A in 0.15% yield. An approach to the trans-decalin ring system of salvinorin A used an intramolecular Diels-Alder reaction/Tsuji allylation strategy, and a total synthesis of salvinorin A was achieved using the intramolecular Diels-Alder / Tsuji allylation approach, combined with an asymmetric late-stage addition of the furan moiety.

=== Detection in urine ===
Researchers found that humans who smoked 580 μg of the pure drug had urine salvinorin A concentrations of 2.4–10.9 μg/L during the first hour; the levels fell below the detection limit by 1.5 hours after smoking.

=== Associated compounds ===
Salvinorin A is one of several structurally related salvinorins found in the Salvia divinorum plant. Salvinorin A is the only naturally occurring salvinorin that is known to be psychoactive. Salvinorin A can be synthesized from salvinorin B by acetylation, and de-acetylated salvinorin A becomes analog to salvinorin B.

Research has produced a number of semi-synthetic compounds. Most derivatives are selective kappa opioid agonists as with salvinorin A, although some are even more potent, with the most potent compound salvinorin B ethoxymethyl ether being ten times stronger than salvinorin A. Some derivatives, such as herkinorin, reduce kappa opioid action and instead act as mu opioid agonists.

The synthetic derivative RB-64 is notable because of its functional selectivity and potency. Salvinorin B methoxymethyl ether is seven times more potent than salvinorin A at KOPr in GTP-γS assays.

== Natural occurrence ==
Salvinorin A occurs naturally in several Salvia species:

- S. divinorum (0.89 mg/g to 3.70 mg/g).
- S. recognita (212.9 μg/g).
- S. cryptantha (51.5 μg/g).
- S. glutinosa (38.9 μg/g).

Salvinorin B has been detected in S. potentillifolia and S. adenocaulon, however these species do not contain a measureable amount of salvinorin A.

=== Biosynthesis ===
The biogenic origin of salvinorin A synthesis has been elucidated using nuclear magnetic resonance and ESI-MS analysis of incorporated precursors labeled with stable isotopes of carbon (carbon-13 ^{13}C) and hydrogen (deuterium ^{2}H). It "is biosynthesized via the 1-deoxy-d-xylulose-5-phosphate pathway", rather than the classic mevalonate pathway, consistent with the common plastidial localization of diterpenoid metabolism.

Terpenoids are biosynthesized from two 5-carbon precursors, isopentenyl diphosphate (IPP) and dimethylallyl diphosphate (DMAPP). The NMR and MS study by Zjawiony suggested that the biosynthesis of salvinorin A proceeds via the 1-deoxy-d-xylulose-5-phosphate pathway. In the deoxyxylulose phosphate pathway, D-glyceraldehyde 3-phosphate and pyruvate, the intermediates of the glycolysis, are converted into 1-deoxy-D-xylulose 5-phosphate via decarboxylation. Subsequent reduction with NADPH generates 2C-methyl-D-erythritol 2,4-cyclodiphosphate, via the intermediates 4-diphosphocytidyl-2-C-methyl-D-erythritol and 4-diphosphocytidyl-2c-methyl-d-erythritol-2-phosphate, which then lead to IPP and DMAPP.

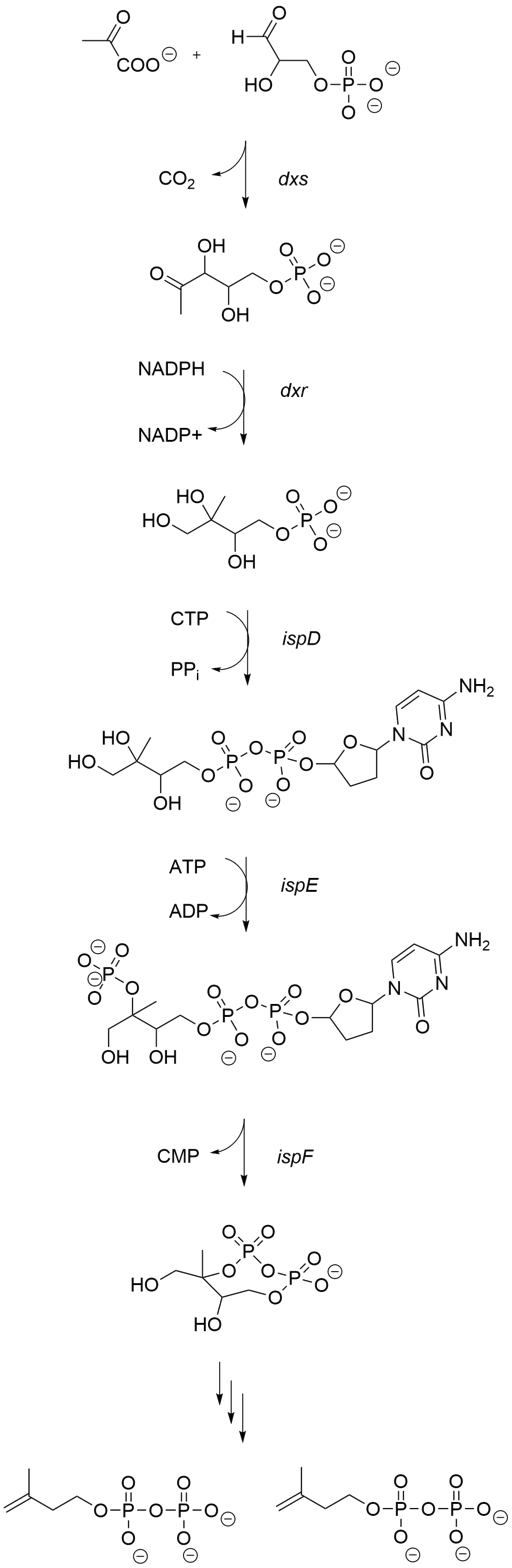
Synthesis of IPP and DMAPP via 1-deoxy-d-xylulose-5-phosphate pathway

Subsequent addition of three 5-carbon IPP units to a single 5-carbon DMAPP unit generates the 20-carbon central precursor, geranylgeranyl diphosphate (GGPP). Bicyclization of GGPP by the class II diterpene synthase, ent-clerodienyl diphosphate synthase (SdCPS2), produces a labdanyl diphosphate carbocation, which is subsequently rearranged through a sequence of 1,2-hydride and methyl shifts to form the ent-clerodienyl diphosphate intermediate. SdCPS2 catalyzes the first committed reaction in the biosynthesis of salvinorin A by producing its characteristic clerodane scaffold. A series of oxygenation, acylation and methylation reactions is then required to complete the biosynthesis of salvinorin A.

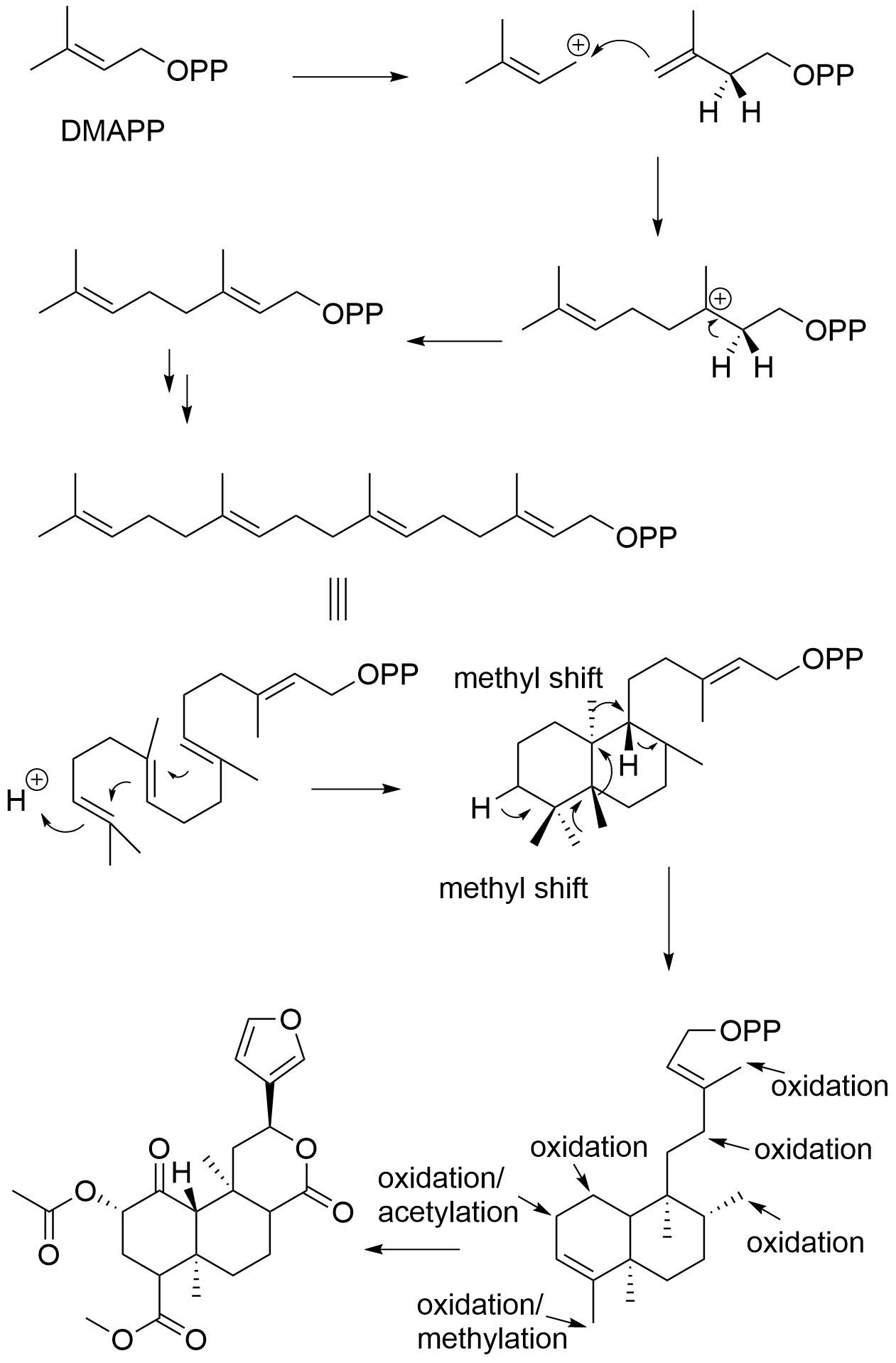
Biosynthesis of salvinorin A

Similar to many plant-derived psychoactive compounds, salvinorin A is excreted via peltate glandular trichomes, which reside external to the epidermis.

== History ==
Salvia divinorum has been used as an entheogen by the Mazatec people of Mexico for hundreds of years. The American anthropologist Jean Bassett Johnson made expeditions to Mexico in the mid-to-late 1930s, observed the entheogenic use of Salvia divinorum by the Mazatecs there, and was the first to describe the existence of the plant in 1939. Subsequently, other researchers, including Blas Pablo Reko and Robert J. Weitlaner, also described the plant and its use in the 1940s and 1950s. Arturo Gómez-Pompa classified the plant as belonging to the genus Salvia in 1957, but was unable to completely identify it at the time due to absence of flowering material. Finally, Robert Gordon Wasson and Albert Hofmann collected flowering specimens of the plant in the early 1960s and sent them to Carl Epling, the leading expert on the Salvia genus of the time, who defined the plant as a new species named Salvia divinorum in 1962.

Salvinorin A was isolated from Salvia divinorum and identified by Alfredo Ortega and colleagues in 1982. They used a combination of spectroscopy and X-ray crystallography to determine the chemical structure of the compound, which was shown to have a bicyclic diterpene structure. Around the same time, Leander Julián Valdés III independently isolated the molecule as part of his doctoral research, published in 1983. Valdés named the chemical divinorin, and also isolated an analogue that he named divinorin B. The naming was subsequently changed to salvinorin A and salvinorin B after the work was published in 1984. Valdés later isolated salvinorin C as well. Daniel Siebert identified salvinorin A as the active constituent of Salvia divinorum via self-experimentation in 1993 and published these findings in 1994. Jonathan Ott published a paper on use of salvinorin A by various means and its effects in 1995. D. M. Turner published his book Salvinorin: The Psychedelic Essence of Salvia Divinorum, further describing salvinorin A's hallucinogenic effects in humans, in 1996.

Salvinorin A was identified as a highly selective and potent κ-opioid receptor (KOR) agonist by Bryan L. Roth and colleagues in 2002. Dennis McKenna has shared that he identified salvinorin A as an extremely high-affinity KOR ligand while working at Shaman Pharmaceuticals in the early 1990s, but did not publish his findings as he could not believe how potent it was and thought that his results were erroneous. Roland Griffiths and colleagues and other researchers characterized the effects of salvinorin A in humans in formal clinical studies in the 2010s. Griffiths and colleagues further showed that salvinorin A's hallucinogenic and other effects in humans were blocked by the KOR antagonist naltrexone in 2016.

== Society and culture ==
=== Legal status ===
Salvinorin A is sometimes regulated together with its host, Salvia divinorum, due to its psychoactive and analgesic effects.

==== United States ====
Salvinorin A is not scheduled at the federal level in the United States. Its molecular structure is unlike any Schedule I or II drug, so possession or sales is unlikely to be prosecuted under the Federal Analogue Act.

===== Florida =====
"Salvinorin A" is a Schedule I controlled substance in the state of Florida making it illegal to buy, sell, or possess in Florida. There is an exception however for "any drug product approved by the United States Food and Drug Administration which contains salvinorin A or its isomers, esters, ethers, salts, and salts of isomers, esters, and ethers, if the existence of such isomers, esters, ethers, and salts is possible within the specific chemical designation."

==== Australia ====
Salvinorin A is considered a Schedule 9 prohibited substance in Australia under the Poisons Standard (October 2015). A Schedule 9 substance is a substance which may be abused or misused, the manufacture, possession, sale or use of which should be prohibited by law except when required for medical or scientific research, or for analytical, teaching or training purposes with approval of Commonwealth and/or State or Territory Health Authorities.

==== Sweden ====
Sveriges riksdags health ministry Statens folkhälsoinstitut classified salvinorin A (and Salvia divinorum) as "health hazard" under the act Lagen om förbud mot vissa hälsofarliga varor (translated Act on the Prohibition of Certain Goods Dangerous to Health) as of April 1, 2006, in their regulation SFS 2006:167 listed as "salvinorin A", making it illegal to sell or possess.

Salvinorin A has been screened for its possible use as a structural "scaffold" in medicinal chemistry in developing new drugs for treating psychiatric diseases such as cocaine dependence.

== See also ==
- List of hallucinogens
- List of entheogens
