= Kurkinorin =

Clinical data
- Drug class: μ-Opioid receptor agonist
- ATC code: None

Identifiers
- IUPAC name: methyl (2S,4aR,6aR,7R,10aR,10bR)-9-benzoyloxy-2-(furan-3-yl)-6a,10b-dimethyl-4,10-dioxo-2,4a,5,6,7,10a-hexahydro-1H-benzo[f]isochromene-7-carboxylate
- CAS Number: 2087975-93-5
- PubChem CID: 132079904
- ChemSpider: 129459192
- ChEMBL: ChEMBL4786506
- CompTox Dashboard (EPA): DTXSID901336857

Chemical and physical data
- Formula: C_{28}H_{28}O_{8}
- Molar mass: 492.524 g·mol^{−1}
- 3D model (JSmol): Interactive image
- SMILES: C[C@@]12CC[C@H]3C(=O)O[C@@H](C[C@@]3([C@H]1C(=O)C(=C[C@H]2C(=O)OC)OC(=O)C4=CC=CC=C4)C)C5=COC=C5
- InChI: InChI=1S/C28H28O8/c1-27-11-9-18-26(32)36-21(17-10-12-34-15-17)14-28(18,2)23(27)22(29)20(13-19(27)25(31)33-3)35-24(30)16-7-5-4-6-8-16/h4-8,10,12-13,15,18-19,21,23H,9,11,14H2,1-3H3/t18-,19-,21-,23-,27-,28-/m0/s1; Key:PJQKOFKRIYWHQP-JXSGGZGWSA-N

Kurkinorin is a non-nitrogenous, extremely selective centrally acting μ-opioid receptor agonist derived from salvinorin A with no sedating or rewarding effects.

== See also ==
- Herkinorin
- Samidorphan
- Norbinaltorphimine
