= Κ-Opioid receptor agonist =

Drug class

κ-Opioid receptor agonist
- Drug class
- Salvinorin A, a well-known KOR agonist found in Salvia divinorum and a hallucinogen

Class identifiers
- Synonyms: kappa-Opioid receptor agonist; KOR agonist; Kappa agonist; Dysdelic; Salvinoid
- Use: As hallucinogens or entheogens, as analgesics for pain, to treat pruritus (itch), and treatment of alcoholism
- Mechanism of action: κ-Opioid receptor agonism
- Biological target: κ-Opioid receptor
- Chemical class: Salvinorins; Benzomorphans or benzazocines; Morphinans; Peptides; Others

Legal status

A κ-opioid receptor agonist, or simply KOR agonist or kappa agonist, is a drug which acts as an agonist of the κ-opioid receptor (KOR), the target of the endogenous dynorphin peptides such as dynorphin A and one of several types of opioid receptors. They can variably produce hallucinogenic effects, pro-depressive and dysphoric effects, sedation, analgesic effects, antipruritic (anti-itch) effects, and anti-addictive effects, among others. Due to their various effects, KOR agonists are used for a variety of medical uses and for other purposes.

Salvinorin A is a highly potent and selective KOR agonist and hallucinogen found in Salvia divinorum (diviner's sage) which has been used as an entheogen by the Mazatec people of Mexico and as a recreational drug elsewhere. The psychoactive and other effects of salvinorin A have been evaluated in clinical studies. The non-selective opioid receptor antagonist naltrexone blocks the effects of salvinorin A. Synthetic analogues with greater potency and/or duration include salvinorin B methoxymethyl ether (2-MMSB) and salvinorin B ethoxymethyl ether (2-EMSB). The irreversible G protein-biased agonist RB-64 (22-thiocyanatosalvinorin A) has unknown psychoactivity.

Nalorphine (N-allylnormorphine; Lethidrone; Nalline) was an early opioid antagonist used to reverse opioid overdose which acts as a dual μ-opioid receptor (MOR) agonist–antagonist and KOR agonist and was superseded by other drugs like naloxone due to producing dysphoria and hallucinogenic effects among other drawbacks. Nalmefene (Revex, others) is a dual MOR antagonist and KOR lower-efficacy partial agonist which is used in the treatment of opioid overdose and alcoholism.

Certain benzazocine or benzomorphan opioid analgesics like pentazocine (Talwin) and phenazocine (Prinadol, Narphen) act as dual KOR agonists and MOR agonists or antagonists and can produce hallucinogenic effects and dysphoria due to their KOR agonism. Pentazocine has also been studied and reported to be effective in treating mania in bipolar disorder. Nalbuphine (Nubain) and its prodrug dinalbuphine sebacate (Naldebain) are also dual KOR agonists and MOR agonists or antagonists used as analgesics. Butorphanol (Stadol) is another opioid analgesic acting as a dual KOR agonist and MOR agonist or antagonist with analgesic and dysphoric effects. Enadoline (CI-977) and spiradoline (U-62066) are highly selective KOR agonists that were under development as analgesics for treatment of pain but were abandoned due to side effects like hallucinogenic effects and dysphoria.

Nalfurafine (Remitch) is an atypical centrally active but non-hallucinogenic KOR agonist with G protein bias which is approved for the treatment of pruritus (itching). Difelikefalin (Korsuva) is a peripherally selective and hence likewise non-hallucinogenic KOR agonist which is approved and used in the treatment of pruritis as well.

Noribogaine and ibogaine (via metabolism into noribogaine) act as potent atypical KOR agonists with G protein bias, among many other actions, and are found in Tabernanthe iboga (iboga). Their KOR agonism may be involved in ibogaine's putative antiaddictive effects in the setting of opioid dependence. Analogues with strongly enhanced KOR agonist potency such as oxa-noribogaine, GM-3009, and 4-allyl-6-oxa-noribogainalog have been developed. GM-3009 is under development by Gilgamesh Pharmaceuticals for the treatment of opioid-related disorders.

The selective KOR agonist and benzomorphan MR-2034 ((–)-MR-2033) led to the initial discovery in the 1980s that KOR agonists produce hallucinogenic and dysphoric effects as opposed to these effects being mediated by concomitant sigma receptor agonism.

Collybolide, a highly potent and selective KOR agonist structurally reminiscent of salvinorin A but with biased agonism and different effects, has been reported to be produced by the mushroom Rhodocollybia maculata. However, subsequent research reported that collybolide was in fact inactive as a KOR agonist and that previous findings had been erroneous.

== See also ==
- κ-Opioid receptor § Agonists
- List of hallucinogens
