= Salvinorin B ethoxymethyl ether =

Clinical data
- Other names: 2-O-Ethoxymethylsalvinorin B; EOM-salB; symmetry
- Routes of administration: Smoking
- Drug class: κ-Opioid receptor agonist; Hallucinogen
- ATC code: None

Legal status
- Legal status: Legal/Uncontrolled

Pharmacokinetic data
- Onset of action: Within seconds (smoked)
- Duration of action: ≥30 minutes (smoked)

Identifiers
- IUPAC name: (2S,4aR,6aR,7R,9S,10aS,10bR)-9-(ethoxymethoxy)-2-(3-furanyl)dodecahydro -6a,10b-dimethyl-4,10-dioxo-2H-naphtho-[2,1-c]pyran-7-carboxylic acid methyl ester
- CAS Number: 1017524-76-3
- PubChem CID: 24873526
- ChemSpider: 23323659
- ChEMBL: ChEMBL272939

Chemical and physical data
- Formula: C_{24}H_{32}O_{8}
- Molar mass: 448.512 g·mol^{−1}
- 3D model (JSmol): Interactive image
- SMILES: CCOCO[C@H]1C[C@H]([C@@]2(CC[C@H]3C(=O)O[C@@H](C[C@@]3([C@H]2C1=O)C)C4=COC=C4)C)C(=O)OC
- InChI: InChI=1S/C24H32O8/c1-5-29-13-31-17-10-16(21(26)28-4)23(2)8-6-15-22(27)32-18(14-7-9-30-12-14)11-24(15,3)20(23)19(17)25/h7,9,12,15-18,20H,5-6,8,10-11,13H2,1-4H3/t15-,16-,17-,18-,20-,23-,24-/m0/s1; Key:ICVTXAUKIHJDGV-WFOQEEKOSA-N

Salvinorin B ethoxymethyl ether (EOM-salB, symmetry) is a κ-opioid receptor agonist and semi-synthetic analogue of the natural product salvinorin A, the psychoactive compound in Salvia divinorum. It has greatly increased potency compared to salvinorin A and can show a longer duration of action, depending on the route of administration.

EOM-salB was first reported in 2008. It has been sold online as an analytical standard since at least 2023.

== Use and effects ==
EOM-salB is active when smoked with a threshold dose of 10 to 50 μg, clear hallucinogenic effects at a dose of 50 μg, and marked effects occurring at doses of 150 to 300 μg. For comparison, salvinorin A has shown threshold effects at doses of 200 to 500 μg vaporized and notable effects occurring at a dose of more than 1,000 μg, making EOM-salB far more potent in comparison. Moreover, EOM-salB is among the most potent psychoactive drugs known, with potency comparable to LSD and certain synthetic opioids.

The effects of smoked EOM-salB begin within seconds, peak effects are reached after about 1 minute, and effects begin to rapidly diminish after around 5 minutes, which is all similar to the case of salvinorin A. However, unlike salvinorin A, residual effects continue with EOM-salB for at least 30 minutes, with baseline reached by 2 hours post-administration, and hence it has a longer overall duration of action.

The effects of EOM-salB are similar to those of salvinorin A. At low doses, they have been reported to include spoked geometric closed- and open-eye visions, changes in perspective, and palinopsia (visual echoes). At higher doses, the effects have been reported to include mental confusion, derealization, more vivid geometric visions, and ego dissolution. Both low and high doses of the drug produced feelings of foreboding. No entity encounters were reported.

== Pharmacology ==
=== Pharmacodynamics ===
EOM-salB has an affinity (K_{i}) of 0.32 nM at the κ-opioid receptor, and around 3,000 times selectivity over the μ- and δ-opioid receptors, making it one of the most potent and selective κ-opioid receptor agonists yet discovered. In animal studies, it fully substituted for salvinorin A and the synthetic κ-opioid receptor agonist U-69593, and was active at doses as low as 0.005 mg/kg.

In animal studies, EOM-salB shows milder side effects than other κ-opioid receptor agonists, producing no significant sedation, motor impairment, anhedonia, or aversion.

=== Pharmacokinetics ===
The ethoxymethyl ether in EOM-salB is more resistant to hydrolysis than the acetate group in salvinorin A, so the compound persists longer in plasma. However, it only achieves a longer brain residence time via certain routes of administration, probably due to active efflux from the brain. Another contributor may be faster oxidation by CYP450 enzymes.

== Chemistry ==
=== Synthesis ===
The synthesis of EOM-salB from salvinorin B has been described.

=== Analogues ===
Analogues of EOM-salB include salvinorin A, salvinorin B, salvinorin B methoxymethyl ether (MOM-salB), herkinorin, and RB-64 (22-thiocyanatosalvinorin A), among others.

== Research ==
In animal models, EOM-salB has been investigated for multiple potential therapeutic applications in addiction, demyelinating disease, and pain:

- Addiction: In rat models of cocaine self-administration, EOM-salB was shown to dose-dependently lessen drug-seeking behaviors.
- Multiple sclerosis: In mouse models of multiple sclerosis, EOM-salB effectively reduced disease severity, as well as increasing myelin levels.
- Pain: EOM-salB has been considered alongside other κ-opioid receptor agonists for pain, particularly chemotherapy-induced neuropathic pain.

== See also ==
- κ-Opioid receptor agonist
