= Chemurgy =

Branch of applied chemistry

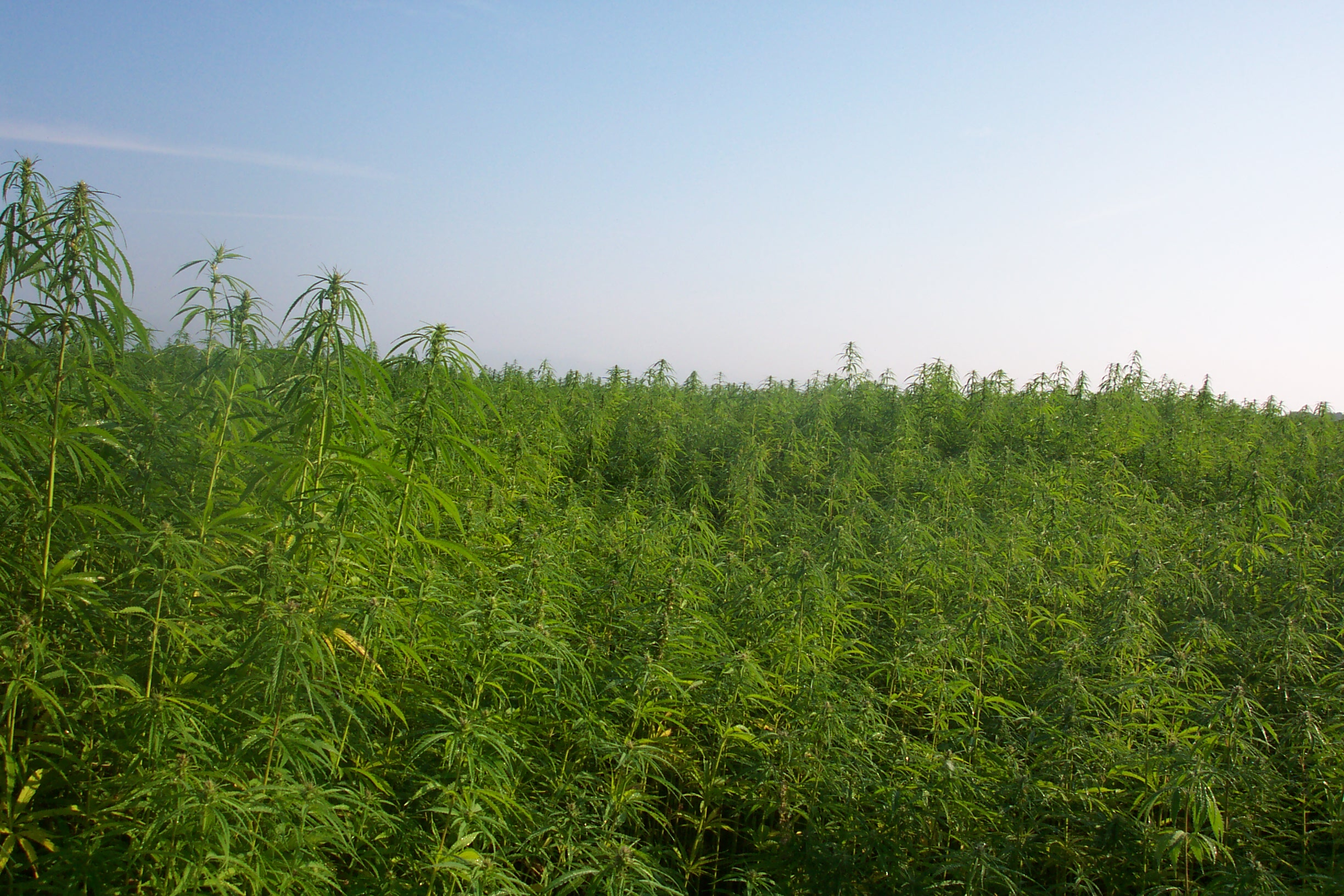
Industrial cultivation of hemp, grown for fiber and grain

Chemurgy is a branch of applied chemistry concerned with preparing industrial products from agricultural raw materials. The concept developed by the early years of the 20th century. For example, products such as brushes and motion picture film were made from cellulose. Beginning in the 1920s, chemist William J. Hale, agricultural journalist Wheeler McMillen, and other Americans began advocating a greater link between farmers and industry. The word "chemurgy" was coined by Hale and first publicized in his 1934 book The Farm Chemurgic. Chemurgy found some success and application during World War II, but was opposed by the petroleum industry and the term fell out of usage by the 1950s.

== The Hemp Body or Soybean Car ==
Automaker Henry Ford began to test farm crops for their industrial potential around 1930, and soon settled on hemp and the soybean as particularly promising (the famous Hemp Body or Soybean Car). The Ford Motor Company used soybeans in such parts as gearshift knobs and horn buttons, and hemp for the body of the car. The automobile was designed to run on hemp diesel. Ford Motor Company accessed these innovations via the discovery and ingenuity of George Washington Carver, Tuskegee Scientist and Father of Chemurgy.

In 1935, the Farm Chemurgic Council (later renamed the National Farm Chemurgic Council) was formed to encourage greater use of renewable raw materials in industry. In its early years, the Council received substantial publicity. It was perceived by the Roosevelt Administration as a political threat, since Council leaders questioned U.S. Department of Agriculture policies. First placing much of its emphasis on demonstrating the benefits of Agrol (a line of blended motor fuels that included ethanol), the Council drew strong opposition from the petroleum industry. The Agrol pilot plant, which also experienced management and financial difficulties, shut down in 1938. Wheeler McMillen, who had become president of the Council the previous year, decided to distance the chemurgy movement from ethanol, mend fences with the petroleum industry, and place the Council on a more cautious course.

The Council’s cause received an unexpected boost when Theodore G. Bilbo, a U.S. senator from Mississippi, sought a means to promote new uses for his region’s surplus cotton. To make his goal more politically attractive, he supported a broader research program. In the end, four regional U.S. Department of Agriculture laboratories, dedicated to finding new uses for farm crops, were authorized under the Agricultural Adjustment Act of 1938. The labs were established in Wyndmoor, Pennsylvania; New Orleans, Louisiana; Peoria, Illinois; and Albany, California. Over time, their research agendas expanded, and they became less focused on chemurgy. Nevertheless, their involvement in that field was symbolic of the chemurgy movement’s transformation from a cause associated with Roosevelt Administration critics to one with clear support from that administration.

== Emergence ==
Chemurgy demonstrated its worth during World War II, particularly in alleviating the rubber shortage caused when Japan cut off most of America's supply. Corn was used as raw material in much of the synthetic rubber produced during the war. Various other plants, including guayule and kok-saghyz (Russian dandelion), were investigated as rubber sources. In the American Midwest, school children were encouraged to gather milkweed floss, previously considered a nuisance but now valued for a new role as a filler in military life jackets. A priest in Iowa even made news by urging congregants to grow hemp, whose previous reputation as a drug hazard yielded to military requirements for rope and cordage.

== Decline ==
The word "chemurgy" decreased in use by 1950. By this point, the methods had yielded modest inroads to industry and research, including four national research laboratories, the development of the Southern pine industry, and the initial emergence of the American flax paper industry. After this time, awareness of the term as connoting a distinct set of industrial techniques faded, and the methods themselves did not spread further.

Explanations for the decline vary. From a market perspective, the simplest explanation is substitution by fossil fuels, which proved cheaper for industrial production of many materials. Beyond this, misaligned incentives and cultural aspects of the industry may have restrained investor enthusiasm and adoption by farmers. From an investment perspective, chemurgical projects often failed to move from pilot products to full-scale production. This leads some analysts to suggest that chemurgy disappointed too many investors in particular projects over time. Indeed, a related problem was in the industry's leadership and funding: a small number of private investors supplied the majority of the industry, and many decisions in it were guided by leadership personality conflicts in the small cadre of corporate-technocratic scientists in industry. This emphasis in the industry on the technological side may have dampened enthusiasm among farmers. The leaders of the industry promoted rapid technological shifts in agricultural production, which was opposed by the more conservative uptake of new technologies in agriculture. Finally, public programs aligned incentives against the industry. The New Deal provided immediate subsidies to farmers, whereas chemurgy as an industry required a longer-term program.

Prospects for chemurgy appeared promising into the 1950s. An article in the December 3, 1951 issue of Newsweek, said "the flood of chemurgy seems to be swelling." But as uses of agricultural raw materials advanced, so did uses for petrochemicals, and non-renewable materials eventually won out in a number of markets. Petrochemical detergents were widely used in place of agriculturally derived soaps, and petrochemical plastic wrapping material largely replaced cellophane. The Chemurgic Council went through a period of decline and finally closed its doors in 1977.

In recent years, there has been a resurgence of interest in chemurgy, although the word itself has largely fallen out of usage. In 1990, Wheeler McMillen then 97 years old, addressed a national conference of latter-day chemurgic enthusiasts in Washington, DC. The conference served to launch the New Uses Council, which seeks to further the cause formerly promoted by the Chemurgic Council.

George Washington Carver was one of the most famous scientists of this field. In the Environmental Biography of George Washington Carver titled "My Work is that of Conservation" author Mark D. Hersey writes, "Thus, although he accepted the honorary mantle of "the first and greatest chemurgist," he was hardly in its mainstream. On the contrary, Carver often misconstrued the movement's aims, imagining they fell more in line with his own than in fact they did. Because Carver had devoted his energies to improving the lives of impoverished black farmers, he saw chemurgy as a field in which science addressed "a great human problem." His 1936 injunction to "chemicalize the farm" sprang from his abhorrence of waste rather than a desire for profit, let alone an affinity for chemical pesticides and fertilizers. He wanted "waste products of the farm" to be used for making "insulating boards, paints, dyes, industrial alcohol, plastics of various kinds, rugs, mats and cloth from fiber plants, oils, gums and waxes, etc."

== Substitution examples ==
- Kenaf for jute (rope)
- castor oil for petroleum-based oil (lubrication)

== See also ==
- Decorticator
- Semisynthesis
