= WMS-2539 =

Names
- Preferred IUPAC name (2S,4S)-2-[(4S)-2,2-Diphenyl-1,3-dioxolan-4-yl]-4-fluoropiperidine

Identifiers
CAS Number	1257844-26-0
3D model (JSmol)	Interactive image
ChEMBL	ChEMBL1277697
ChemSpider	26348553
PubChem CID	52941919
UNII	G922A8S2QV
CompTox Dashboard (EPA)	DTXSID001045706
- InChI: InChI=1S/C20H22FNO2/c21-17-11-12-22-18(13-17)19-14-23-20(24-19,15-7-3-1-4-8-15)16-9-5-2-6-10-16/h1-10,17-19,22H,11-14H2/t17-,18-,19+/m0/s1 Key: OLGOYYOHTNZCEO-GBESFXJTSA-N; InChI=1/C20H22FNO2/c21-17-11-12-22-18(13-17)19-14-23-20(24-19,15-7-3-1-4-8-15)16-9-5-2-6-10-16/h1-10,17-19,22H,11-14H2/t17-,18-,19+/m0/s1 Key: OLGOYYOHTNZCEO-GBESFXJTBS
- SMILES: C1CN[C@@H](C[C@H]1F)[C@H]2COC(O2)(C3=CC=CC=C3)C4=CC=CC=C4

Properties
Chemical formula	C_{20}H_{22}FNO_{2}
Molar mass	327.399 g·mol^{−1}
- Except where otherwise noted, data are given for materials in their standard state (at 25 °C [77 °F], 100 kPa). Infobox references

WMS-2539 is a fluorinated derivative of dexoxadrol and a potent uncompetitive NMDA receptor antagonist.
