= Irmgard Weitlaner-Johnson =

American anthropologist

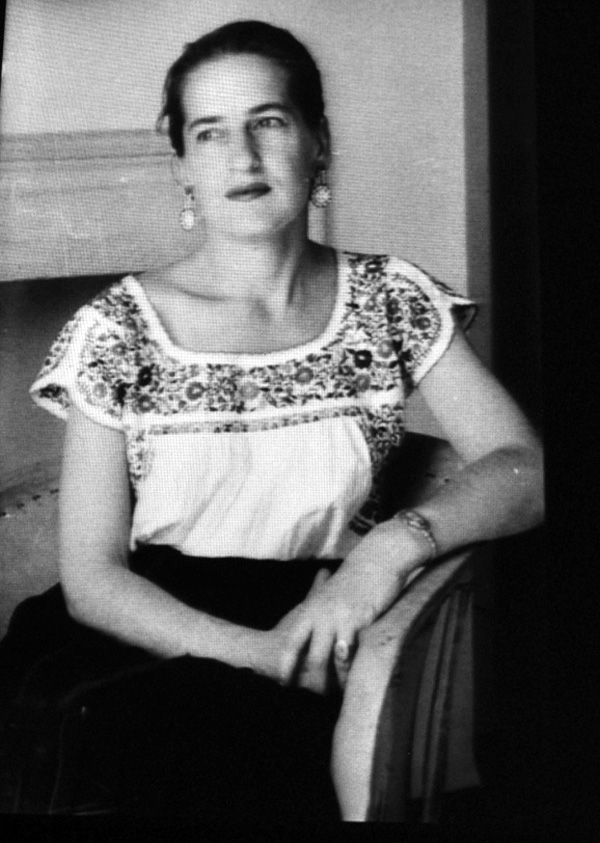
- Born: 1914
- Died: 2011 (aged 96–97)
- Citizenship: United States
- Education: University of California, Berkeley
- Spouse: Jean Bassett Johnson
- Scientific career
- Fields: Anthropology

Irmgard Weitlaner-Johnson (1914–2011) was an American anthropologist who was an expert in Mexican textiles. She studied cultural anthropology and ethnographic textiles at the University of California, Berkeley.

== Life and career ==
In July 1938, in Huautla de Jimenez, she and her husband, anthropologist Jean Bassett Johnson, along with Bernard Bevan and Louise Lacaud, were some of the first outsiders to witness and record a Mazatec healing ceremony where hallucinogenic psilocybin mushrooms (teonanacatl) were consumed.

Weitlaner-Johnson began her systematic study of Mexican textiles in 1951 and later became curator of textiles at Mexico's National Museum of Anthropology.

== Selected works ==
=== Articles ===
- Weitlaner-Johnson, Irmgard & Rosario Ramírez, "Indumentaria otopame en el Museo Nacional de Antropología", Arqueología Mexicana. No. 73, pp. 46–51.
- Weitlaner-Johnson, Irmgard (1957). "Survival of feather ornamented huipiles in Chiapas, Mexico". Journal de la Société des Américanistes. Vol. 46, pp. 189–196.
- Weitlaner-Johnson, Irmgard (1962). "Industrias y tejidos de Tuxpan, Jalisco, México." Anales del Instituto Nacional de Antropología e Historia. Vol. 6, no. 14, pp. 149–217.
- Weitlaner-Johnson, Irmgard (1960). "Un tzotzopatli antiguo de la región de Tehuacán". Anales Del Instituto Nacional De Antropología E Historia, vol. 6, no. 11, pp. 75–85.

=== Books ===
- Weitlaner-Johnson, Irmgard (1993). Mexican Indian Folk Designs: 252 Motifs from Textiles. New York: Dover Publications. ISBN 978-0-486-27524-6. OCLC 27338148.
- Irmgard, Weitlaner-Johnson (1976). Design Motifs on Mexican Indian Textiles. Graz, Austria: Akademische Druck- u. Verlagsanstalt.
