= Salvinorin C =

Clinical data
- Drug class: κ-Opioid receptor ligand
- ATC code: None

Identifiers
- IUPAC name: methyl (2S,4aR,6aR,9S,10R,10aR,10bR)-9,10-diacetyloxy-2-(furan-3-yl)-6a,10b-dimethyl-4-oxo-1,2,4a,5,6,9,10,10a-octahydrobenzo[f]isochromene-7-carboxylate
- PubChem CID: 11134539
- ChemSpider: 9309657
- ChEMBL: ChEMBL365547

Chemical and physical data
- Formula: C_{25}H_{30}O_{9}
- Molar mass: 474.506 g·mol^{−1}
- 3D model (JSmol): Interactive image
- SMILES: CC(=O)O[C@H]1C=C([C@@]2(CC[C@H]3C(=O)O[C@@H](C[C@@]3([C@H]2[C@H]1OC(=O)C)C)C4=COC=C4)C)C(=O)OC
- InChI: InChI=1S/C25H30O9/c1-13(26)32-18-10-17(22(28)30-5)24(3)8-6-16-23(29)34-19(15-7-9-31-12-15)11-25(16,4)21(24)20(18)33-14(2)27/h7,9-10,12,16,18-21H,6,8,11H2,1-5H3/t16-,18-,19-,20-,21-,24-,25-/m0/s1; Key:FQPFAKLWYQMQER-DZQZDKHXSA-N

Salvinorin C is a naturally occurring terpene of the salvinorin family and minor constituent of Salvia divinorum. It showed 256-fold lower affinity for the κ-opioid receptor (KOR) than the related compound salvinorin A (K_{i} = 1,022 nM vs. 4 nM, respectively). The drug's functional activity at the KOR was not assessed or reported. Daniel Siebert reported via self-experimentation that salvinorin C has no psychoactive or hallucinogenic effects in humans. Salvinorin C was first described in the scientific literature by Leander J. Valdés III and colleagues in 2001. Its weak activity at the κ-opioid receptor was reported by Bryan L. Roth and colleagues in 2005, while its properties in humans were reported by Siebert in 2004.

== See also ==
- Salvinorin
