= Jean Bassett Johnson =

American linguist

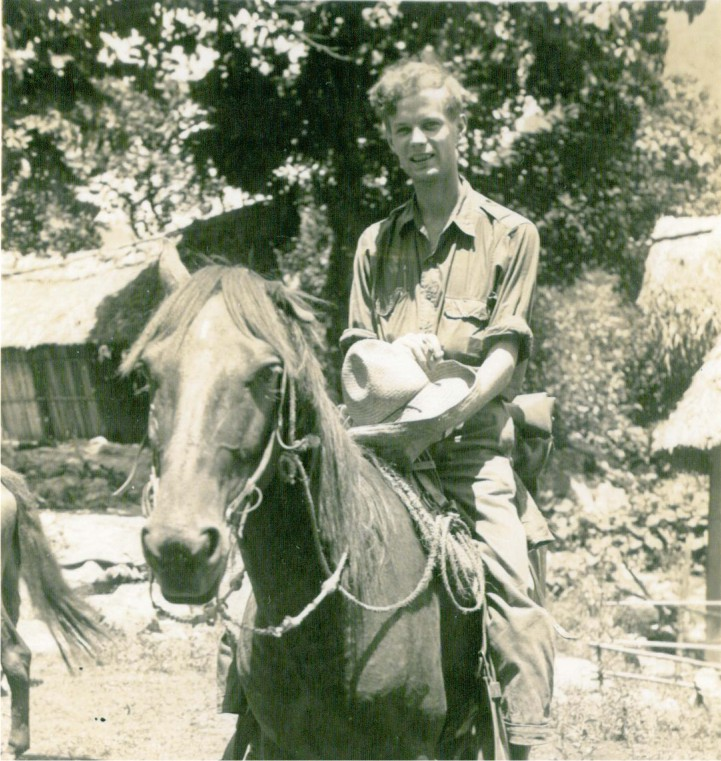
- Trip to the Mazateca (Oaxaca, Mexico) in 1938.
- Born: September 7, 1915; Moscow, Idaho
- Died: April 4, 1944 (aged 28); Tunisia
- Cause of death: Killed in action
- Citizenship: United States
- Education: University of California, Berkeley
- Spouse: Irmgard Weitlaner
- Scientific career
- Fields: Linguistics, Anthropology
- Academic advisors: Alfred Kroeber and Robert Lowie

Jean Bassett Johnson (September 7, 1915 – April 4, 1944) was an American anthropologist and linguist who conducted field studies in Mexico during the 1930s and early 1940s. A doctoral candidate at the University of California, Berkeley, he was a student of Alfred Kroeber and Robert Lowie.

== Life and career ==
Johnson carried out field research among the Chinantec and Mazatec in Oaxaca, the Nahuatl in Jalisco and Colima, and the Yaqui, Varohio, Pima and Opata in Sonora. In July 1938, in Huautla de Jimenez, he and his wife, anthropologist Irmgard Weitlaner-Johnson, along with Bernard Bevan and Louise Lacaud, were some of the first outsiders, in addition to Robert J. Weitlaner (1936), to witness and record a Mazatec healing ceremony where hallucinogenic psilocybin mushrooms (teonanacatl) were consumed. During the course of his research on Mazatec healing practices, Johnson also recorded the use of another hallucinogen, “hierba Maria” now known to be Salvia divinorum. In 1939–1940, under the direction of Morris Swadesh, Johnson conducted a study of the Yaqui language, published posthumously.

Johnson's studies were interrupted by the Second World War. He joined the United States Naval Reserve in 1942 and died in Tunisia in 1944.

== Selected works ==
=== Articles ===
- Johnson, Jean Bassett (1939). "The Elements of Mazatec Witchcraft". Gothenburg, Sweden: Ethnological Studies, No. 9.
- Johnson, Jean Bassett (1939). "Some notes on the Mazatec". Mexico DF: Revista Mexicana de Estudios Antropologicos, Vol 3, no. 2.

=== Books ===
- Johnson, Jean Bassett (1962). El Idioma Yaqui ["The Yaqui Language"]. Mexico DF: Instituto Nacional de Antropologia e Historia. (published posthumously)
