= Holy water in the Ethiopian Orthodox Tewahedo Church =

Holy water in Ethiopian Christianity

Holy water (Amharic: ፀበል) is a deeply rooted practice in the Ethiopian Orthodox Tewahedo Church, believed to have the power to exorcise demons and cure illnesses. It can be poured onto people or consumed by drinking. Various monasteries are renowned for their holy water, and many Ethiopian Christians make pilgrimages to these sites to acquire it. Additionally, holy water plays a significant role in the Timkat (Epiphany) celebration, where priests bless it to baptize Christians, with the purpose of "purifying souls from sins."

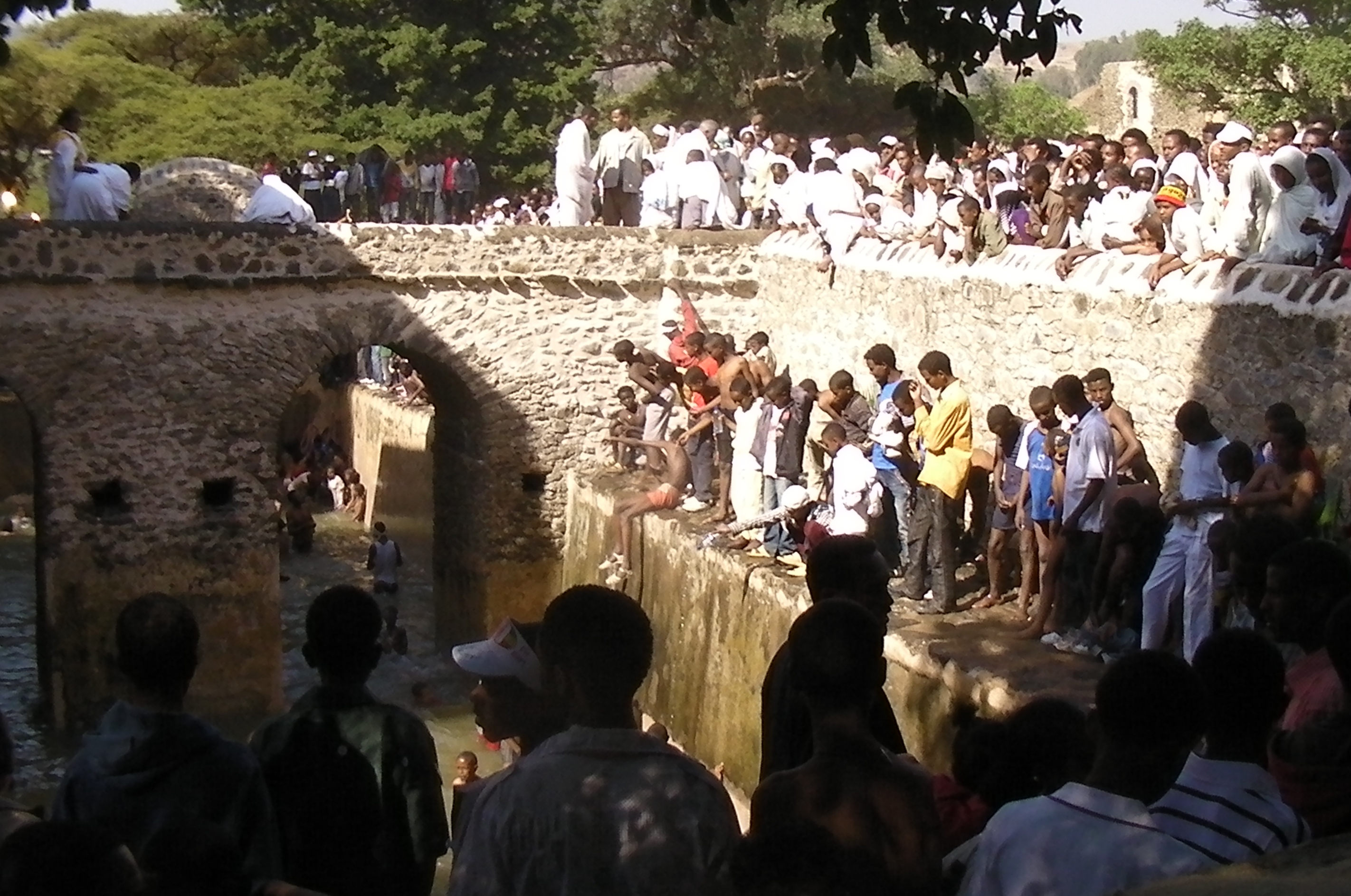
Timkat ceremony at Fasilides Bath, 2011

== Purposes ==
The Ethiopian Orthodox Tewahedo Church believes that holy water can heal people from demonic afflictions and illnesses. The water is also consumed to remove "harmful things inside the stomach." Studies show that the majority of Ethiopians prefer traditional healing methods, such as holy water, over biomedical services for major illnesses, particularly for mental health issues. Approximately 98% of first encounters for mental health problems involve traditional healing methods using holy water.

Holy water is also associated with the treatment of HIV AIDS, particularly when used alongside antiretroviral therapy (ART), though this practice remains controversial among research participants. Many people visit holy water sites, such as monasteries, for treatment, with some sites receiving up to 5,000 pilgrims daily. The process of using holy water includes prayer, consumption, and bathing. Visitors often fill bottles or jerrycans with holy water to consume at home. In Lalibela, the use of traditional healing methods is common. An estimated 5,000 people moved to the Entoto Church, where holy water is also found, with many flocking to the renowned Tsadkane Mariam Monastery.

== In celebration ==
Holy water is often used during public holidays such as Timkat (Epiphany), when Christians gather around a small water pool prepared by priests on Ketera, the eve of Timkat. After priests and deacons pray over and bless the water, it is sprayed onto the people "for the purification of their souls from sins committed." Most of these events take place at Jan Meda Square.

In Gondar, the Fasilides Bath symbolizes the Jordan River. On the eve of Timkat, local people flock to the city and gather at the bath, with eight of the forty-four tabots arriving from all directions.
