= Etoxadrol =

Chemical compound

Clinical data
- ATC code: none

Legal status
- Legal status: In general: legal

Identifiers
- IUPAC name: (2S)-2-[(2S,4S)-2-ethyl-2-phenyl-1,3-dioxolan-4-yl]piperidine
- CAS Number: 28189-85-7
- PubChem CID: 19324
- ChemSpider: 16735807
- UNII: SIQ2UWR01K
- ChEMBL: ChEMBL305904
- CompTox Dashboard (EPA): DTXSID10912322

Chemical and physical data
- Formula: C_{16}H_{23}NO_{2}
- Molar mass: 261.365 g·mol^{−1}
- 3D model (JSmol): Interactive image
- SMILES: CC[C@]1(C2=CC=CC=C2)OC[C@H]([C@H]3NCCCC3)O1
- InChI: InChI=1S/C16H23NO2/c1-2-16(13-8-4-3-5-9-13)18-12-15(19-16)14-10-6-7-11-17-14/h3-5,8-9,14-15,17H,2,6-7,10-12H2,1H3/t14-,15+,16-/m0/s1; Key:INOYCBNLWYEPSB-XHSDSOJGSA-N

Etoxadrol (CL-1848C) is a dissociative anaesthetic drug that has been found to be an NMDA antagonist and produce similar effects to PCP in animals. Etoxadrol, along with another related drug dexoxadrol, were developed as analgesics for use in humans, but development was discontinued in the late 1970s after patients reported side effects such as nightmares and hallucinations.

== Chemical structure ==
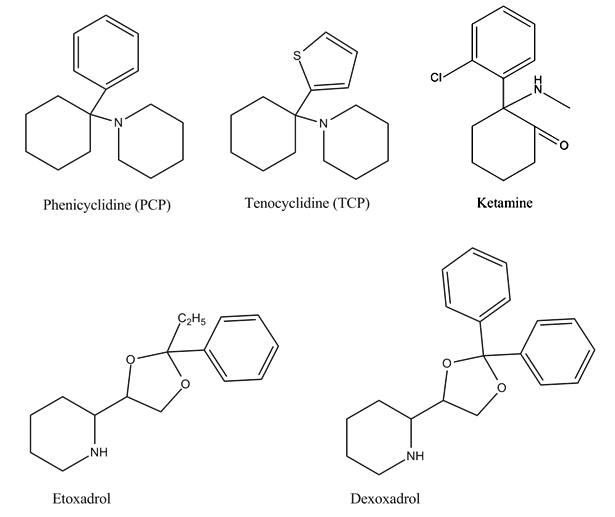
Phencyclidine (PCP), ketamine, etoxadrol and dexoxadrol all contain phenyl and amino groups, which bind to the PCP site on the NMDA receptor. Tenocyclidine contains a thiophene ring instead, which is bioisosteric with a phenyl ring.

Phencyclidine (PCP), tenocyclidine (TCP), etoxadrol and its precursor, dexoxadrol have related chemical structures. These drugs all act similarly on the nervous system, acting as dissociative hallucinogens (meaning that they interfere with normal sensory signals, replacing them with hallucinations of any sensory modality!) with anesthetic and analgesic properties.

== Pharmacodynamics ==
Etoxadrol is a non-competitive NMDA receptor antagonist. It binds with high affinity to the PCP binding site on the NMDA receptor (K_{i} = 107 nM, determined by the displacement of radiolabeled TCP). Normally, the inactivated NMDA receptor possesses a magnesium (Mg^{2+}) block in the channel, blocking the passage of cations.

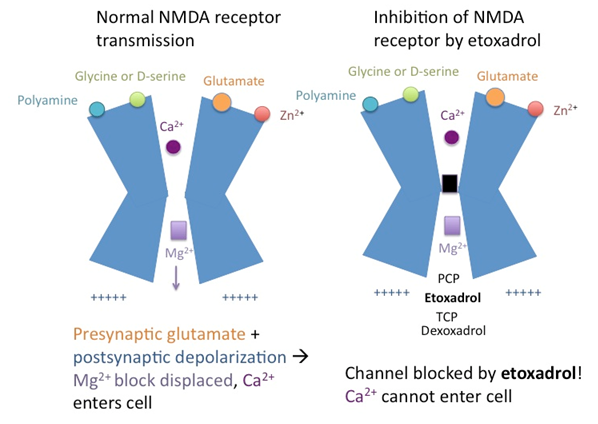
NMDA receptor action in the absence (left) or presence (right) of etoxadrol.

When the neurotransmitter glutamate binds to the NMDA receptor, and the postsynaptic cell membrane is depolarized (from the postsynaptic cell being activated), the magnesium block in the NMDA receptor channel is displaced. Calcium (Ca^{2+}) and sodium (Na^{+}) can enter the cell via the open channel, while potassium (K^{+}) can exit the cell. Etoxadrol antagonizes the NMDA receptor by binding to the PCP site, located just above the magnesium block in the ion channel. In the event that the magnesium block is displaced, etoxadrol blocks the NMDA receptor channel, preventing cations from entering or exiting the channel. This mechanism of action also applies to PCP, TCP, ketamine and dexoxadrol.

Etoxadrol binding does not affect the binding affinity of other sites on the NMDA receptor, as found by binding studies showing the displacement of radiolabeled TCP by etoxadrol (TCP binding in the absence of etoxadrol: K_{i} = 19.2 × 10^{−9} M, B_{max} = 1.36 pmol/mg protein; TCP binding in the presence of etoxadrol: K_{i} = 21.7 × 10^{−9} M, B_{max} = .66 pmol/mg protein).

Despite its anesthetic and analgesic effects, etoxadrol does not interact with benzodiazepine, muscarinic acetylcholine, or mu opioid receptors. However, etoxadrol may act in the dopamine reward pathway, explaining its reinforcing properties.

== Pharmacokinetics ==
Etoxadrol goes into effect 90 seconds after intravenous (IV) administration, and its anesthetic effects typically last for half an hour to an hour. Since etoxadrol is administered intravenously, the bioavailable dose is always the same as the administered dose. Etoxadrol's analgesic effects can last for up to 2 hours or more after patients have regained consciousness.

Etoxadrol is lipophilic and can readily cross the blood–brain barrier. Because of its lipophilic structure, etoxadrol can be absorbed by fat tissues and organs (e.g. the liver). Etoxadrol also acts on the respiratory and cardiovascular systems.

== Treatment ==
Etoxadrol was intended as an anesthetic for patients requiring particularly long periods of anesthesia for surgery. As an anesthetic, etoxadrol is more potent than ketamine, but less potent than PCP.

Etoxadrol is also a potent analgesic. Patients given etoxadrol often reported that they were aware of experiencing pain upon waking from anesthesia, but it did not bother them. Post-operative analgesics are rarely required after patients undergoing surgery are administered etoxadrol.

Etoxadrol (along with ketamine, dexoxadrol, and other PCP-like drugs) is an anticonvulsant, preventing tonic seizures in mice that are administered pentylenetetrazol (PTZ), which normally induces seizures.

== Side effects ==
Like ketamine, etoxadrol produces increases in heart rate and respiratory rate. Etoxadrol may also cause vomiting. At high enough doses, etoxadrol also exhibits effects on the muscular system such as convulsions or loss of the righting reflex. When administered in excess, etoxadrol can be lethal on the respiratory system. Monkeys given extremely high (> 20 mg/kg) doses of etoxadrol died of apparent respiratory failure.

Etoxadrol produces a wide variety of dreams, ranging from pleasant to frightening or aversive. Approximately half of patients given etoxadrol report pleasant dreams, 25% report unpleasant dreams, and the remaining 25% experience no dreams at all. Such dreams were frequently described as “floating,” “puffy” or “out of this world." Dreams and hallucinations may persist for as long as 18 to 24 hours. In rare cases, etoxadrol can induce periods of psychotic activity during this recovery period.

In the brain, etoxadrol slows down the synthesis of serotonin to 50-60% of control rates and speeds up the rate of dopamine synthesis by up to 200% of the normal rate 4–6 hours after intravenous administration.

Like a number of other drugs (e.g. cocaine), etoxadrol has been found to exhibit reinforcing properties. Monkeys will self-administer etoxadrol, dexoxadrol or PCP in a lever-pressing paradigm.
