= Salvinorin B =

Clinical data
- Other names: Divinorin B; Desacetyldivinorin A; Desacetylsalvinorin A; SB; SalB
- ATC code: None

Identifiers
- IUPAC name: methyl (2S,4aR,6aR,7R,9S,10aS,10bR)-2-(furan-3-yl)-9-hydroxy-6a,10b-dimethyl-4,10-dioxo-2,4a,5,6,7,8,9,10a-octahydro-1H-benzo[f]isochromene-7-carboxylate
- CAS Number: 92545-30-7
- PubChem CID: 11440685
- ChemSpider: 9615549
- UNII: 6HNB6FRT7X
- ChEBI: CHEBI:177592
- ChEMBL: ChEMBL424698
- CompTox Dashboard (EPA): DTXSID50465988

Chemical and physical data
- Formula: C_{21}H_{26}O_{7}
- Molar mass: 390.432 g·mol^{−1}
- 3D model (JSmol): Interactive image
- SMILES: C[C@@]12CC[C@H]3C(=O)O[C@@H](C[C@@]3([C@H]1C(=O)[C@H](C[C@H]2C(=O)OC)O)C)C4=COC=C4
- InChI: InChI=1S/C21H26O7/c1-20-6-4-12-19(25)28-15(11-5-7-27-10-11)9-21(12,2)17(20)16(23)14(22)8-13(20)18(24)26-3/h5,7,10,12-15,17,22H,4,6,8-9H2,1-3H3/t12-,13-,14-,15-,17-,20-,21-/m0/s1; Key:BLTMVAIOAAGYAR-CEFSSPBYSA-N

Salvinorin B is a naturally occurring terpene of the salvinorin family and constituent of Salvia divinorum. In contrast to salvinorin A, salvinorin B is inactive at the κ-opioid receptor. Accordingly, unlike salvinorin A, salvinorin B is inactive in producing effects in rodents. Salvinorin B was first described in the scientific literature by Leander J. Valdes and colleagues by 1984. Although salvinorin B is inactive, two derivatives, salvinorin B methoxymethyl ether (2-MMSB) and salvinorin B ethoxymethyl ether (2-EMSB), are highly potent κ-opioid receptor agonists with greater activity than salvinorin A.

== See also ==
- Salvinorin
