= Dexoxadrol =

Chemical compound

Clinical data
- ATC code: none

Legal status
- Legal status: In general: legal

Identifiers
- IUPAC name: (2S)-2-[(4S)-2,2-Di(phenyl)-1,3-dioxolan-4-yl]piperidine
- CAS Number: 4741-41-7
- PubChem CID: 3034023
- ChemSpider: 2298576
- UNII: JY5N9F45AG
- ChEMBL: ChEMBL1165411
- CompTox Dashboard (EPA): DTXSID50912321

Chemical and physical data
- Formula: C_{20}H_{23}NO_{2}
- Molar mass: 309.409 g·mol^{−1}
- 3D model (JSmol): Interactive image
- SMILES: O1C[C@@H](OC1(c2ccccc2)c3ccccc3)[C@H]4NCCCC4
- InChI: InChI=1S/C20H23NO2/c1-3-9-16(10-4-1)20(17-11-5-2-6-12-17)22-15-19(23-20)18-13-7-8-14-21-18/h1-6,9-12,18-19,21H,7-8,13-15H2/t18-,19+/m0/s1; Key:HGKAMARNFGKMLC-RBUKOAKNSA-N

Dexoxadrol (Dioxadrol) is a dissociative anaesthetic drug which has been found to be an NMDA antagonist and produces similar effects to PCP in animals. Dexoxadrol, along with another related drug etoxadrol, were developed as analgesics for use in humans, but development was discontinued after patients reported side effects such as nightmares and hallucinations.

== See also ==
- WMS-2539, a fluorinated derivative of dexoxadrol
