= Clerodane diterpene =

Class of chemical compounds

Clerodane diterpenes, sometimes referred to as clerodane diterpenoids, are a large group of secondary metabolites that have been isolated from several hundreds of different plant species, as well as fungi, bacteria and marine sponges. They are bicyclic terpenes that contain 20 carbons and a decalin core.

== Classification ==
The clerodane diterpenes are classified into four groups trans-cis (TC), trans-trans (TT), cis-cis (CC), and cis-trans (TC) based on the relative stereochemistry at the decalin junction (trans or cis) and the relative stereochemistry of the substituents at C-8 and C-9 (trans or cis). The absolute stereochemistry of the clerodanes is classified as neo (shown below) or ent-neo (enantiomeric to neo). The neo-clerodanes share the same absolute stereochemistry as clerodin. Approximately 25% of clerodanes have the 5:10 cis ring junction. The remaining 75% have a trans 5:10 ring junction.

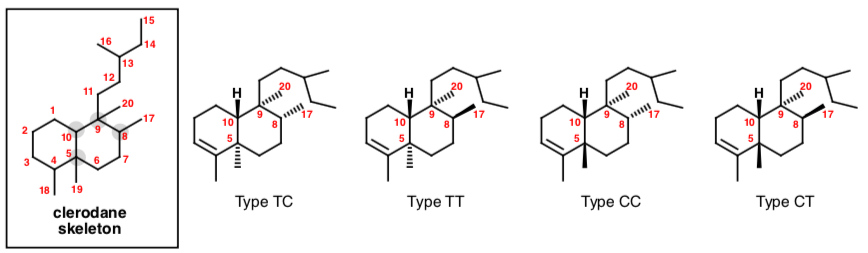
The clerodane skeleton contains 20 carbons and a decalin core. There are four additional distinctions that refer to the stereochemistry of the decalin ring junction and the substituents on the C-8 and C-9 carbons.

== Biosynthesis ==
They are structurally related to the bicyclic labdane diterpenes. Its biosynthesis in plants (mostly present in the families Lamiaceae and Asteraceae) takes place in the chloroplasts. Some forms can be useful intermediates in organic synthesis. Some clerodanes like clerodin (3-desoxy-caryoptinol) from the leaves of Clerodendrum infortunatum (Verbenaceae) have anthelminthic properties, others like ajugarins are repellent to herbivore predators (mostly insects and their larvae) or have a very bitter taste, such as gymnocolin.

Some examples for clerodanes are ajugarins I to V extracted from bugleweeds like Ajuga remota, Ajuga ciliata, Ajuga decumbens, common skullcap (Scutellaria galericulata), and germanders (Teucrium sp.), cascarillin from Croton eluteria, calumbins from Jateorhiza columba, Jateorhiza palmata and guduchi (Tinospora cordifolia), gymnocolin from Gymnocolea inflata, hardwickiic acid from Hardwickia species (Fabaceae). Neo-clerodane diterpenes can have hallucinogenic properties such as salvinorin A, a trans-neoclerodane diterpene from Salvia divinorum.

== See also ==
- Salvinorin A
