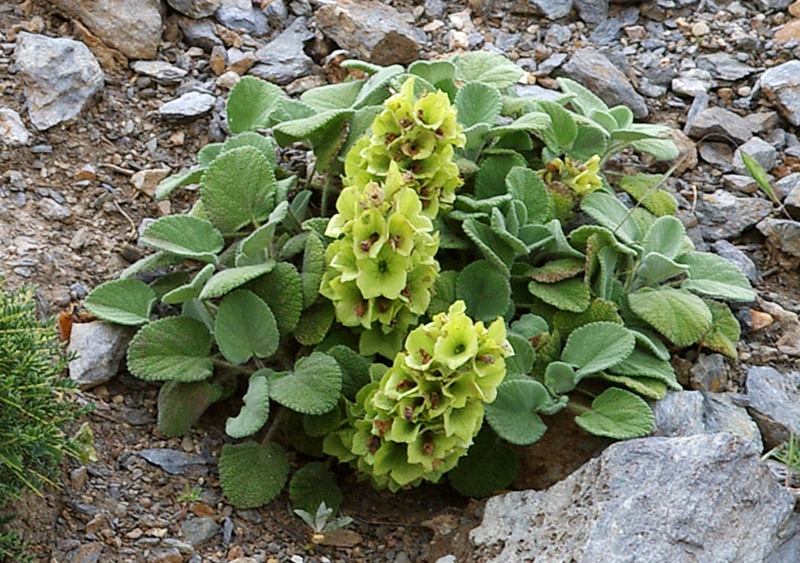

Scientific classification
- Kingdom: Plantae
- Clade: Tracheophytes
- Clade: Angiosperms
- Clade: Eudicots
- Clade: Asterids
- Order: Lamiales
- Family: Lamiaceae
- Genus: Salvia
- Species: S. absconditiflora

Binomial name
- Salvia absconditiflora Greuter & Burdet

Synonyms
- Salvia cryptantha Montbret & Aucher ex Benth.

= Salvia absconditiflora =

Species of flowering plant

Salvia absconditiflora is a perennial plant species of the family Lamiaceae. It is endemic to Turkey.

It contains Salvinorin A at a concentration of 51.5 micrograms per gram of plant material.
