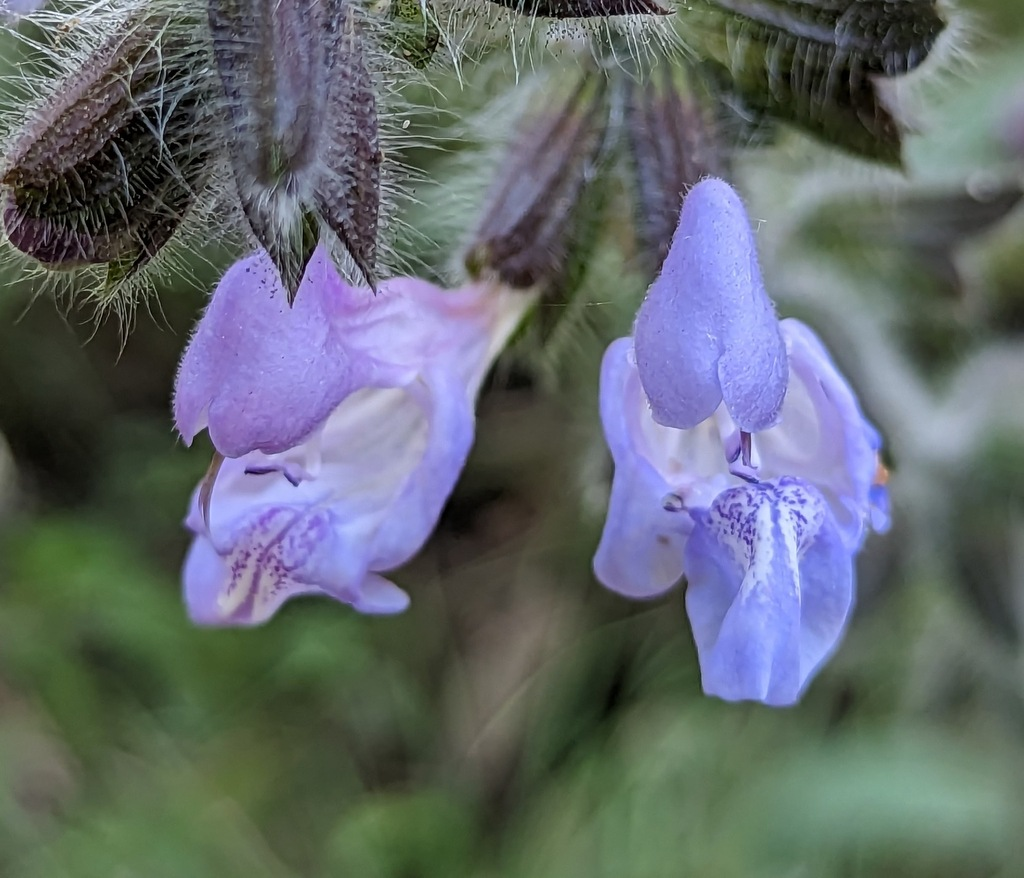

Scientific classification
- Kingdom: Plantae
- Clade: Tracheophytes
- Clade: Angiosperms
- Clade: Eudicots
- Clade: Asterids
- Order: Lamiales
- Family: Lamiaceae
- Genus: Salvia
- Species: S. recognita

Binomial name
- Salvia recognita Fisch. & Meyer

= Salvia recognita =

Species of flowering plant

Salvia recognita is a woody-based perennial that is endemic to central Turkey, typically growing in light shade at the base of cliffs, at elevations of less than 4,000 feet (1,200 m). This species has been reported to contain salvinorin A. However, this report has not been replicated, and a previous study of 441 Salvia species from many regions found salvinorin A only in Salvia divinorum, from Mexico.

A mass of divided leaves forms a small to medium basal clump, with leaves ranging in size from 3-4 inches to nearly 1 foot long, with three or more leaflets. The light green leaves are covered with thick hairs, giving it a grayish cast and thick texture, with each leaf blade having a wine-colored petiole. The flowers are cyclamen-pink, growing in whorls, with calyces that are covered in glands and hairs. The flower stalks reach 2–3 feet long, with many whorls of widely spaced flowers.
