= Robert J. Weitlaner =

Robert J. Weitlaner (April 28, 1883 - July 23, 1968) was an Austrian-born American-Mexican ethnologist and metallurgist born in Steyr, Austria, the son of the civil engineer Julius Weitlaner and Therese Pillinger, a schoolteacher. He studied engineering at Montanuniversität Leoben, from which he graduated in 1908 with the degree of metallurgical engineer. A year later he immigrated to the United States, where he practiced his profession with major American steel companies in Pittsburgh (1909-1910), Buffalo (1910-1913), Philadelphia (1913-1916), Baltimore (1916-1919) and Cleveland (1919-1922). Weitlaner died in Mexico City on July 23, 1968, aged 86.

== Career ==
Weitlaner moved to Mexico in 1922, accompanied by his wife, Olga Lipp, who had followed him to America, and his young daughters Irmgard and Olga. In Mexico City, he worked as a metallurgical engineer with La Consolidada, Mexico's largest steel company, until his retirement in 1939. The events that led an Austrian professional engineer to Mexico by way of the United States and to a postprofessional career of nearly thirty years resulting in almost a hundred published works.

Weitlaner began his countless trips to the Otomi and, beginning in 1934, to the Chinantec. One of Weitlaner's arguably most important developments in the years that followed include the re-discovery by western nations of Mexican psilocybin mushrooms in 1936. As a consequence of the experience and knowledge derived from these field studies, and from wide reading in Mexican linguistics and ethnology, he was sufficiently well grounded in anthropology when he left La Consolidada to pass the professional examination that led to a full-time appointment as Ethnologist in the National Institute of Anthropology and History, a post he had occupied on a part-time basis for several years prior to 1939.

With the founding of the National School of Anthropology and History about the same time, he was appointed (in 1940) Professor of Indigenous American Languages, of Otomian Languages, and of Contemporary Ethnology of Mexico and Central America, teaching first in the old National Museum of Anthropology (Mexico) on Calle Moneda, behind the National Palace (Mexico); and after 1964 in the new Museum of Anthropology in Chapultepec Park.
