= Salvinorin B methoxymethyl ether =

Chemical compound

Clinical data
- Other names: 2-O-Methoxymethylsalvinorin B; MOM-salB
- Drug class: κ-Opioid receptor agonist; Hallucinogen
- ATC code: None

Legal status
- Legal status: Unknown/Depends on country

Identifiers
- IUPAC name: methyl (2S,4aR,6aR,7R,9S,10aS,10bR)-2-(furan-3-yl)-9-(methoxymethoxy)-6a,10b-dimethyl-4,10-dioxo-2,4a,5,6,7,8,9,10a-octahydro-1H-benzo[f]isochromene-7-carboxylate
- CAS Number: 864378-87-0
- PubChem CID: 44456192
- ChemSpider: 23323947
- ChEMBL: ChEMBL258098
- PDB ligand: U99 (PDBe, RCSB PDB)
- CompTox Dashboard (EPA): DTXSID201028497

Chemical and physical data
- Formula: C_{23}H_{30}O_{8}
- Molar mass: 434.485 g·mol^{−1}
- 3D model (JSmol): Interactive image
- SMILES: C[C@@]12CC[C@H]3C(=O)O[C@@H](C[C@@]3([C@H]1C(=O)[C@H](C[C@H]2C(=O)OC)OCOC)C)C4=COC=C4
- InChI: InChI=1S/C23H30O8/c1-22-7-5-14-21(26)31-17(13-6-8-29-11-13)10-23(14,2)19(22)18(24)16(30-12-27-3)9-15(22)20(25)28-4/h6,8,11,14-17,19H,5,7,9-10,12H2,1-4H3/t14-,15-,16-,17-,19-,22-,23-/m0/s1; Key:KFVUSZPWUZBAPF-AGQYDFLVSA-N

Salvinorin B methoxymethyl ether (MOM-salB) is a semisynthetic analogue of the natural product salvinorin A which is derived from salvinorin B and used in scientific research.

MOM-salB and has increased affinity and potency at the κ-opioid receptor. It can have a duration of action of up to 3 hours in mice, which is much longer than salvinorin A. The crystal structure is almost superimposable with that of salvinorin A. Structures bound to the κ-opioid receptor have also been reported.

Salvinorin B methoxymethyl ether has a K_{i} of 0.60 nM at the κ-opioid receptor, and is around five times more potent than salvinorin A in animal studies, although it is still only half as potent as its ethoxymethyl ether homologue, salvinorin B ethoxymethyl ether (EOM-salB; "symmetry").

== See also ==
- κ-Opioid receptor agonist
- Salvinorin B
- Salvinorin B ethoxymethyl ether (EOM-salB)
- RB-64 (22-thiocyanatosalvinorin A)
