= RB-64 =

Chemical compound

Clinical data
- Other names: RB64; 22-Thiocyanatosalvinorin A
- Drug class: Irreversible κ-opioid receptor agonist

Legal status
- Legal status: Legal/Uncontrolled

Identifiers
- IUPAC name: Methyl (2S,4aR,6aR,7R,9S,10aS,10bR)-2-(furan-3-yl)-6a,10b-dimethyl-4,10-dioxo-9-(2-thiocyanatoacetyl)oxy-2,4a,5,6,7,8,9,10a-octahydro-1H-benzo[f]isochromene-7-carboxylate
- CAS Number: 1174223-49-4
- PubChem CID: 73347341
- ChemSpider: 30812525
- UNII: GH7ZNH3JMF
- ChEMBL: ChEMBL2381583
- CompTox Dashboard (EPA): DTXSID701031954

Chemical and physical data
- Formula: C_{24}H_{27}NO_{8}S
- Molar mass: 489.54 g·mol^{−1}
- 3D model (JSmol): Interactive image
- SMILES: C[C@@]12CC[C@H]3C(=O)O[C@@H](C[C@@]3([C@H]1C(=O)[C@H](C[C@H]2C(=O)OC)OC(=O)CSC#N)C)C4=COC=C4
- InChI: InChI=1S/C24H27NO8S/c1-23-6-4-14-22(29)33-17(13-5-7-31-10-13)9-24(14,2)20(23)19(27)16(8-15(23)21(28)30-3)32-18(26)11-34-12-25/h5,7,10,14-17,20H,4,6,8-9,11H2,1-3H3/t14-,15-,16-,17-,20-,23-,24-/m0/s1; Key:AZPUAKGNQXURGA-ZWLNRFIDSA-N

RB-64, also known as 22-thiocyanatosalvinorin A, is a semi-synthetic derivative of salvinorin A. It is an irreversible agonist, with a reactive thiocyanate group that forms a bond to the κ-opioid receptor (KOR), resulting in very high potency. It is functionally selective, activating G proteins more potently than β-arrestin-2. RB-64 has a bias factor of up to 96 and is analgesic with fewer of the side-effects associated with unbiased KOR agonists. The analgesia is long-lasting. Compared with unbiased agonists, RB-64 evokes considerably less receptor internalization.

== See also ==
- κ-Opioid receptor agonist
- Herkinorin
- Salvinorin B methoxymethyl ether (2-MMSB)
- Salvinorin A
- Nalfurafine
