= Semisynthesis =

Type of chemical synthesis

Semisynthesis, or partial chemical synthesis, is a type of chemical synthesis that uses chemical compounds isolated from natural sources (such as microbial cell cultures or plant material) as the starting materials to produce novel compounds with distinct chemical and medicinal properties. The novel compounds generally have a high molecular weight or a complex molecular structure, more so than those produced by total synthesis from simple starting materials. Semisynthesis is a means of preparing many medicines more cheaply than by total synthesis since fewer chemical steps are necessary.

Semisynthesis of paclitaxel. Installation of the necessary side chain and acetyl group of paclitaxel by a short series of steps, starting from isolated 10-deacetylbaccatine III.

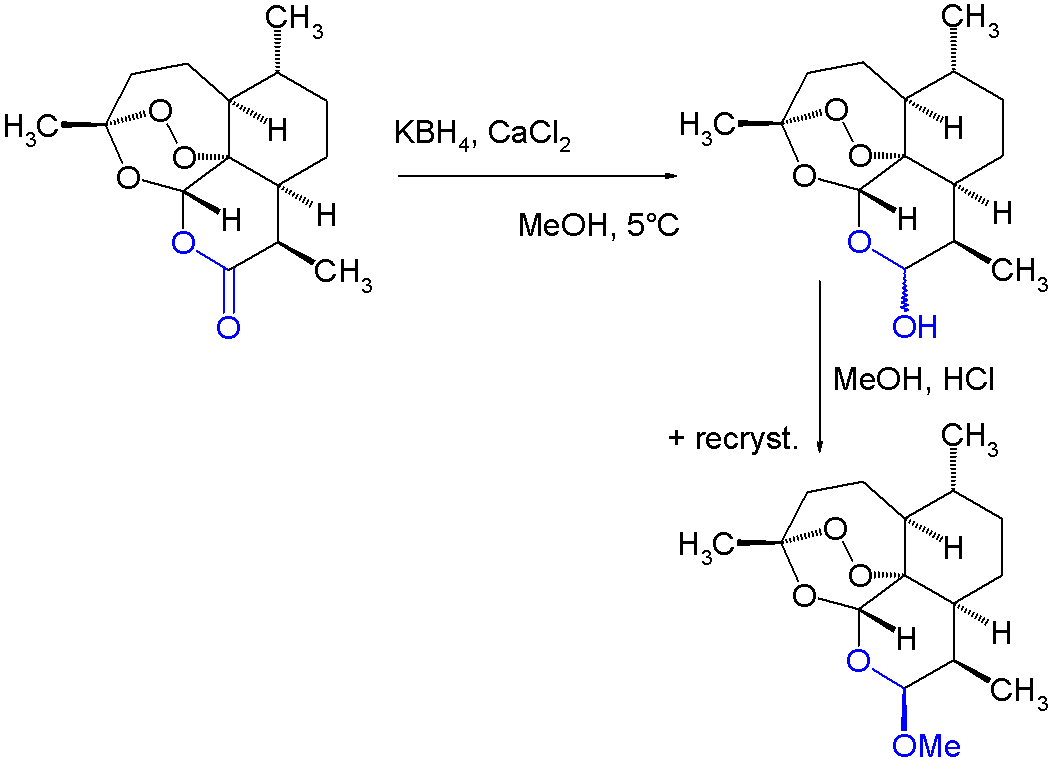
An undesirable lactone ring in artemisinin is replaced by an acetal by reduction with potassium borohydride, followed by methoxylation.

Drugs derived from natural sources are commonly produced either by isolation from their natural source or, as described here, through semisynthesis of an isolated agent. From the perspective of chemical synthesis, living organisms act as highly efficient chemical factories, capable of producing structurally complex compounds through biosynthesis. In contrast, engineered chemical synthesis, although powerful, tends to be simpler and less chemically diverse than the complex biosynthetic pathways essential to life.

== Biological vs engineered pathways ==
Due to these differences, certain functional groups are easier to synthesize using engineered chemical methods, such as acetylation. However, biological pathways are often able to generate complex groups and structures with minimal economic input, making certain biosynthetic processes far more efficient than total synthesis for producing complex molecules. This efficiency drives the preference for natural sources in the preparation of certain compounds, especially when synthesizing them from simpler molecules would be cost-prohibitive.

== Applications ==
Plants, animals, fungi, and bacteria are all valuable sources of complex precursor molecules, with bioreactors representing an intersection of biological and engineered synthesis. In drug discovery, semisynthesis is employed to retain the medicinal properties of a natural compound while modifying other molecular characteristics—such as adverse effects or oral bioavailability—in just a few chemical steps. Semisynthesis contrasts with total synthesis, which constructs the target molecule entirely from inexpensive, low-molecular-weight precursors, often petrochemicals or minerals. While there is no strict boundary between total synthesis and semisynthesis, they differ primarily in the degree of engineered synthesis employed. Complex or fragile functional groups are often more cost-effective to extract directly from an organism than to prepare from simpler precursors, making semisynthesis the preferred approach for complex natural products.

== Notable examples in drug development ==
Practical applications of semisynthesis include the groundbreaking isolation of the antibiotic chlortetracycline and the subsequent semisynthesis of antibiotics such as tetracycline, doxycycline, and tigecycline. Other notable examples include the early commercial production of the anti-cancer agent paclitaxel from 10-deacetylbaccatin, isolated from Taxus baccata (European yew), the semisynthesis of LSD from ergotamine (derived from fungal cultures of ergot), and the preparation of the antimalarial drug artemether from the naturally occurring compound artemisinin. As synthetic chemistry advances, transformations that were previously too costly or difficult to achieve become more feasible, influencing the economic viability of semisynthetic routes.

== See also ==
- Chemurgy
- Drug discovery
- Drug development
- Phytomining
- Production of cephalopsporins from 7-ACA
- Production of penicillins from 6-APA
- Production of steroids from 16-DPA
- Production of ursodeoxycholic acid from cholic acid
