= Legal status of Salvia divinorum in the United States =

Restrictions on the psychoactive plant

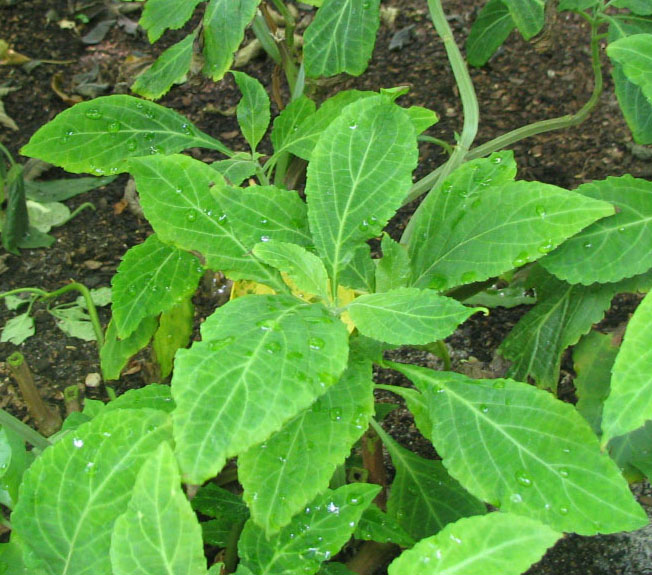
Salvia divinorum

The legal status of Salvia divinorum in the United States varies. At the federal level, the Drug Enforcement Administration (DEA) has indicated that Salvia divinorum and its active constituent, salvinorin A, are not controlled under the Controlled Substances Act. 29 states and the U.S. territory of Guam have passed laws banning the substance.

== Background ==
Rep. Joe Baca (D-California) introduced to the House of Representatives the Hallucinogen Control Act of 2002, which aimed to amend the Controlled Substances Act to add "any material, compound, mixture, or preparation" that contained salvinorin A or Salvia divinorum to a Schedule I controlled substance at the national level. Those opposed to Baca's bill included ethnobotanist Daniel Siebert, who sent a letter to the United States Congress arguing against the proposed legislation, and the Center for Cognitive Liberty & Ethics, who sent key members of Congress a report on Salvia divinorum and salvinorin A, along with letters from an array of scientists who expressed concern that scheduling Salvia divinorum would negatively impact important research on the plant.

Despite Rep. Baca's bill not passing, a number of states have proposed their own legislation. Louisiana, Missouri, Tennessee, Delaware, Florida, Illinois, North Dakota, and Minnesota have passed laws prohibiting Salvia divinorum. Some states, such as Delaware, Louisiana, and Missouri, have imposed the strictest classification of Schedule I. By contrast, the state of Maine has passed laws imposing age restrictions, prohibiting use by and sale to minors, in a manner generally consistent with controls existing for tobacco and alcohol.

Tennessee has a provision for Salvia divinorum in its natural plant form. There the law classifies its use as a Class A misdemeanor, but it is not an offense to possess, plant, cultivate, grow, or harvest Salvia divinorum for "aesthetic, landscaping, or decorative purposes."

Some state laws only mention Salvia divinorum and not its active constituent, salvinorin A. For example, the plant in its natural form is classified as Schedule I in Delaware, while the much more potent purely extracted salvinorin A remains legal. The legislation in Illinois does not mention salvinorin A, but instead includes "the seeds thereof, any extract from any part of that plant, and every compound, [...] derivative, mixture, or preparation of that plant."

== Legal status by state ==
=== Summary ===
This table summarizes the status of various state proposals for salvia legislation, with links to following detail state by state.

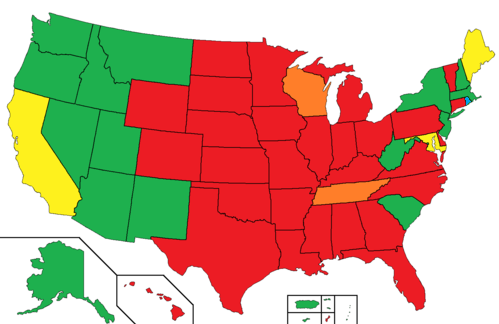
Salvia laws in the United States (may not be fully up to date): Jurisdiction where salvia is illegal. Jurisdiction where salvia is decriminalized. Jurisdiction where salvia is legal with age restrictions. Jurisdiction where salvia extracts are illegal but the plant itself is legal Jurisdiction where salvia is legal.

State	Bill ref.	Proposed date	Classification	Status	Proposer	Salvinorin A included?	Notes
Alabama	HB697	April 22, 2010	Schedule I	Enacted July 17, 2010	Rep. James O. Gordon	Yes	
Alabama	SB330	March 27, 2007	Schedule I	not passed / died	Sen. Hank Erwin	Yes	
Alabama	n/a	October 18, 2007	Schedule I	not passed / died	Sen. Roger Bedford & Rep. Johnny Mack Morrow	unknown	
Alaska	SB313	April 5, 2006	Schedule IIA	not passed / died	Sen. Gene Therriault	No	
Alaska	SB38	January 16, 2007	Schedule IIA	not passed / died	Sen. Gene Therriault	Yes	
Alaska	SB52	January 21, 2009	Schedule IIA	not passed / died	Sen. Gene Therriault	Yes	
Arkansas	SB423	March 2011	Schedule I	Passed		Yes	
California	AB259	February 5, 2007	prohibit sale to minors	Passed – July 22, 2008	Assembly Member Anthony Adams	No, then Yes	Proposed bill wording amended from original Schedule I prohibition to only prohibit sale to minors instead. – Passed. Came into effect on January 1, 2009.
Colorado	11-134	June 2, 2011	Class 2 Misdemeanor	Passed	Colorado State Senate	Yes	See
Connecticut	SB1098	January 2011	To be scheduled	Passed – 6-Jul-2011	"Many legislators, including Senator Boucher" HB6174	Yes ("Salvinorum")	See. Also see
Delaware	SB259	March 16, 2006	Schedule I	Passed – May 2, 2006	Sen. Karen Peterson	No	aka Brett’s law
Florida	SB340, SB1612 & HB1363	February 7, 2008	Schedule I	Passed – May 29, 2008	Sen. Evelyn J. Lynn & Rep. Mary Brandenburg	Yes	Possession felony for up to 5 years in prison. Effective July 1, 2008
Georgia	HB1021	January 1, 2010	"dangerous drug"	Passed – July 1, 2010	Rep. John Lunsford	Yes	Adds "Salvia divinorum A" to list of dangerous drugs. Allows for "possession, planting, cultivation, growing, or harvesting of Salvia divinorum A strictly for aesthetic, landscaping, or decorative purposes."
Hawaii	2745 SD2 HD1 CD1	January 25, 2010	Schedule I	Passed – May 19, 2010	Sen. Colleen Hanabusa	Yes – along with "Divinorin A"	Added to HRS Section 329-14(d) – Hallucinogenic substances
Illinois	SB2589	January 19, 2006	Schedule I	not passed / sine die	Sen. John J. Millner	No	
Illinois	HB457	January 26, 2007	Schedule I	Passed – August 18, 2007	Rep. Dennis M. Reboletti	No	Salvinorin A not mentioned, but bill wording incl. "any extract" from plant. Took effect January 1, 2008.
Indiana	SB57	January 5, 2011	Class A misdemeanor	Passed – July 1, 2011	Alting, Charbonneau, Miller	Yes	
Iowa	HSB133 SSB1051	January 18, 2007	Schedule I	No	Governor's Office of Drug Control Policy	Yes	Amended into House File 491 where it later died.
Iowa	SF510	August 29, 2011	Schedule I	Passed – July 29, 2011	Gov. Terry Branstad	Yes	Enacted 30 days after passing.
Kansas	SB481	January 28, 2008	Schedule I	Passed – April 24, 2008	Sen. Peggy Mast	Yes	incl. any extract from any part, and every compound, manufacture, derivative, mixture or preparation of such plant, its seeds or extracts
Kentucky	SB107	January 26, 2010	Schedule I	Passed – April 26, 2010	Sen. Brandon Smith	Yes	
Louisiana	HB20	February 25, 2005	Schedule I	Passed – August 15, 2005	Rep. Michael G. Strain	No	First State in the US to ban Salvia Divinorum.
Maine	LD66	December 2006	prohibit sale to minors	Passed – May 15, 2007	Rep. Chris Barstow	No, then Yes	Amended – originally proposed 'Schedule Z' classification
Maryland	SB 317 and HB 8	January 28, 2009	Schedule I	did not pass	Senator Gladden and Delegates Haddaway and Eckardt	Yes	Johns Hopkins University expressed their concern concerning the bill's effects on their own research into salvinorin, and the bills subsequently failed in committee
Massachusetts	HB4434	May 16, 2007	Class C	not passed / died	Rep. Viriato Manuel deMacedo and Rep. Daniel K. Webster	Yes	
Massachusetts	HB2037 HB1336 HB1789	January 12, 2009	Class C	not passed / died	Rep. Viriato Manuel deMacedo and Rep. Daniel K. Webster	Yes	
Michigan	SB1373	October 1, 2010	Schedule I	Passed		Yes	
Minnesota	HF2949	February 14, 2008	Schedule IV	not passed / died	Rep. Joe Atkins	No	
Minnesota	SB2668	February 14, 2008	Schedule IV	not passed / died	Sen. Steve Murphy	No	
Minnesota	HF 484	February 2009	Schedule I	not passed / died	Rep. Morrie Lanning	No	
Minnesota	SF0569	February 2009	Schedule I	not passed / died	Sen. Bill Ingebrigtsen	No	
Minnesota	HF2975	February 2010	Gross misdemeanor	not passed / died	Rep. Morrie Lanning	No	
Minnesota	SF2773	February 2010	Gross misdemeanor	Passed – May 18, 2010	Sen. Bill Ingebrigtsen	Yes	
Mississippi	SB2456	January 29, 2008	Schedule I	Passed – July 1, 2008	Sen. Hob Bryan	No	
Missouri	HB165	January 5, 2005	Schedule I	not passed / died	Rep. Rachel L. Bringer	No	
Missouri	HB633	February 23, 2005	Schedule I	Passed – August 28, 2005	Rep Scott A. Lipke and Rep. Rachel L. Bringer	Yes	
Nebraska	LB840	January 10, 2008	Schedule I	not passed / sine die	Attorney General Jon Bruning & Senator Vickie McDonald	Yes	
Nebraska	LB123	January 9, 2009	Schedule I	Passed – February 27, 2009	Sen. Russ Karpisek	Yes	
New Jersey	A1323	January 8, 2008	Schedule I	proposed	Assemblywoman Linda Stender	Yes	
New Jersey	S3426	December 11, 2008	Schedule I	proposed	Sen. Stephen Sweeney	Yes	
New Mexico	HB144	January 21, 2009	Schedule I	not passed / died	Rep. W. Ken Martinez & Rep. Keith J. Gardner	Yes	See New Mexico Statutes Ch. 30, Article 31 for list of controlled substances
New Mexico	HB336	February 3, 2011	Schedule I	not passed / died	Zachary J. Cook	Yes	See New Mexico Statutes Ch. 30, Article 31 for list of controlled substances
New Mexico	SB127	January 27, 2014	Schedule I	not passed / died	Sue Wilson Beffort	Yes	See New Mexico Statutes Ch. 30, Article 31 for list of controlled substances
New York	S1454-2013	April 18, 2005	prohibit sale	Passed – January 2012	Sen. John J. Flanagan	No	fine of no more than $500 per violation
New York	A8920	June 5, 2007	prohibit possession	proposed	Assemblyman Carl Heastie	No	fine of no more than $50 per violation
New York	S07736	March 18, 2008	Schedule I	proposed	no sponsor listed	No	Possession- Class B Misdemeanor. Sale- Class A Misdemeanor
North Carolina	SB138	February 11, 2009	Schedule I	Passed August 6, 2009	Sen. William R. Purcell, Sen. Stan Bingham et al.	Yes	applies to all forms of Salvia divinorum
North Dakota	SB2317	January 15, 2007	Schedule I	Passed – August 1, 2007	Sen. Dave Oehlke, Sen. Randell Christmann et al.	No, then Yes	bill refers to salvinorin A and "any of the active ingredients" of Salvia divinorum
Ohio	HB215	May 2007	Schedule I	Passed – January 6, 2009	Rep. Thom Collier	Yes	
Oklahoma	HB2485	March 6, 2006	prohibit extracts	Passed – May 26, 2006	Rep. John Nance	Yes	enhanced, concentrated, and chemically or physically altered
Oklahoma	HB3148	May 23, 2008	Schedule I	Passed – May 23, 2008	Rep. David Derby and Sen. Jonathan Nichols	Yes	applies to all forms of Salvia divinorum – law comes into effect November 1, 2008
Oregon	SB592	February 22, 2003	Schedule I	not passed / died	Sen. Richard Devlin and Sen. Ryan Deckert		
Oregon	HB3485	March 15, 2003	Schedule I	not passed / died	Rep. Billy Dalto		
Oregon	HB2494	January 25, 2007	Schedule I	not passed / died	Rep. John Lim	Yes	
Pennsylvania	HB2657	May 2, 2006	Schedule I	not passed / died	Rep. James Casorio et al.	Yes	
Pennsylvania	SB1217	June 16, 2006	Schedule I	not passed / died	Sen. Lisa Boscola et al.	No	
Pennsylvania	SB710	March 29, 2007	Schedule I	proposed	Sen. Lisa Boscola et al.	No	
Pennsylvania	HB1379	May 29, 2007	Schedule I	proposed	Rep. Beyer et al.	No	
Pennsylvania	HB1547	June 18, 2007	Schedule I	proposed	Rep. James Casorio et al.	Yes	
Pennsylvania	SB1006		Schedule I	Passed – June 23, 2011		Yes	
Rhode Island	2014-H 7191, 2014-S 2651	June 10, 2014	Schedule I	Passed	Rep. Arthur J. Corvese Sen. Frank S. Lombardi	Yes	only extracts are Schedule I; the "unaltered plant" is explicitly exempted
South Carolina	H4687	February 13, 2008	Schedule I	Passed House / later died	Rep. Huggins	Yes	
South Dakota	HB1090	January 20, 2009	Class 1 misdemeanor / Class 6 felony	Passed – March 11, 2009	Rep. Chuck Turbiville	No	possession of less than 2 ounces a misdemeanor, 2 ounces or more a felony
Tennessee	SB3247 /HB2909 /TCA 39-17-438	February 15, 2006	Class D Felony	Passed – July 1, 2006	Rep. Park M. Strader, Sen. Tim Burchett	Yes	not an offense to possess, plant, cultivate, grow, or harvest Sd for aesthetic, landscaping, or decorative purposes
Texas	HB2347	March 2, 2007	Penalty Group 2	not passed / died	Rep. Charles "Doc" Anderson	Yes	Penalty Group 2 of the Texas Controlled Substances Act
Texas	HB3784	March 9, 2007	Penalty Group 3	not passed / died	Rep. Tan Parker	Yes	Penalty Group 3 of the Texas Controlled Substances Act
Texas	SB1796	March 9, 2007	prohibit sale to minors	not passed / died	Sen. Craig Estes	No	proposed concurrently to HB2347 and HB3784 above
Texas	HB126	November 11, 2008	Penalty Group 3	proposed	Rep. Charles "Doc" Anderson	Yes	Penalty Group 3 of the Texas Controlled Substances Act
Texas	SB257	November 11, 2008	prohibit sale to minors	proposed	Sen. Craig Estes	No	proposed concurrently to HB126 above
Texas	HB124	June 14, 2013	Penalty Group 3	Passed – June 14, 2013	Representatives Anderson, Stephenson, Price, and Flynn	Yes	Added Salvia divinorum, unless unharvested and growing in its natural state, meaning all parts of that plant, whether growing or not, the seeds of that plant, an extract from a part of that plant, and every compound, manufacture, salt, derivative, mixture, or preparation of that plant, its seeds, or extracts, including salvinorin A, to Penalty Group 3 of the Texas Controlled Substances Act.
Utah	HB190	January 18, 2007	Schedule I	not passed / died	Rep. Paul Ray	No, then Yes	
Utah	HB260	January 9, 2008	Schedule I	not passed / died	Rep. Paul Ray	Yes	
Utah	HB277	January 28, 2009	Schedule I	proposed	Rep. Paul Ray	Yes	
Virginia	HB2844	January 10, 2007	Schedule I	Enacted March 4, 2008	Delegate John M. O'Bannon III	only	Any material, compound, mixture, or preparation, which contains any quantity of salvinorin A (another name: Divinorin A). – The plant Salvia divinorum was not mentioned
Wisconsin	AB186	April 2, 2009	Fine not to exceed $10,000	Passed	Rep. Cullen et al.	only	Wisconsin banned manufacturing, distributing, or delivering salvinorin A the extraction. The law does not name Salvia divinorum the organic plant as a controlled statute, therefore the live, raw, or dried plant is still legal by law and not part of the ban under this statute.
Wyoming	HB49	February 13, 2006	Schedule I	not passed / died	Rep. Stephen Watt	No	
Wyoming	HB62		Schedule I	Passed – July 1, 2011		Only	Salvinorin A is misspelled as "Salvinorum A". Salvia divinorum is not specifically listed but the plant is covered by the law because it contains salvinorin A, which is specifically listed in the bill.

=== Alabama ===
Alabama Code § 13A-12-214.1 (2024) states that "the possession of Salvia divinorum or salvinorum A, including all parts of the plant presently classified botanically as Salvia divinorum [...] shall be illegal in this state."

=== Alaska ===
On April 5, 2006, Senator Gene P. Therriault (R) proposed adding Salvia divinorum to Alaska's list of Schedule IIA controlled substances. The bill died in committee.

On January 16, 2007, he proposed another bill (Senate Bill 38).

On February 2, 2008, the Anchorage Daily News reported that the bill still remained in the finance committee, but that Therriault hoped it would be addressed in the 2008 session. The bill did not progress previously because it got buried behind higher-priority bills that needed to be heard in Finance, said Miles Baker, legislative assistant to Sen. Bert Stedman (R-Sitka) who co-chairs the committee.

Therriault claimed that the drug's effects are similar to LSD's, and too powerful, dangerous and unpredictable to leave it unrestricted. "What I'm trying to do here is be proactive instead of reactive to the newest drug on the scene," he said. Therriault also communicated in an email to an individual expressing concern over the criminalization of this plant that "we cannot have people worshiping plants," which raises concern over his Baptist background and the separation of religion and State.

Lt. Andy Greenstreet, deputy commander of the Alaska Bureau of Alcohol and Drug Enforcement, said "Reports of problems stemming from the plant's use are rare to nonexistent in Alaska."

Jack Degenstein, with the Alaska Libertarian Party, who opposed Therriault's bill in a Senate hearing in 2007, said, "This is absolutely not a public safety risk" [...] "just because it's powerful doesn't mean it's dangerous."

Jason Dowell, chairman of the Alaska Libertarian Party, said people should have the freedom to choose, especially when the choice is about a plant that has had traditional medicinal uses in Mexico. "It's ridiculous that they would try to make plants illegal," Dowell said. "It's just a recipe for disaster. They're going to send innocent people to prison and invade their privacy."

Daniel Seibert's website reported that Therriault's second salvia bill (Senate Bill 38) also died in committee.

However, in February 2009, it was reported that Alaska's Health and Social Services committee has passed (referred to the next stage Judiciary committee) Therriault's third attempt to outlaw salvia (Senate Bill 52).

"The problem with continuing to allow uncontrolled access to salvia is that the long term effects appear to be the same as other hallucinogens, such as LSD and mescaline, and that is often depression and schizophrenia," said Sen. Gene Therriault.

=== California ===
On February 5, 2007, Assembly Member Anthony Adams (R) proposed Assembly Bill 259. The bill wording was amended on March 12, 2007, to include Salvinorin A. The bill proposed adding Salvia divinorum and Salvinorin A to California's list of Schedule I controlled substances.

The bill was referred to the Committee on Public Safety with a due date for public hearing on March 27, 2007. The bill analysis, indicated that opposition to the bill was registered by, among others, Daniel Siebert and the Drug Policy Alliance. The bill was defeated in Committee by a 3–2 vote. A reconsideration was granted and the second hearing was on January 15, 2008.

The bill wording was significantly amended on January 7, 2008. The proposal for Schedule I classification was dropped and replaced instead with restrictions on the sale to minors. Section 379 to be added to the penal code, "Every person who sells, dispenses, distributes, furnishes, administers, gives, or offers to sell, dispense, distribute, furnish, administer, or give Salvia divinorum or Salvinorin A, or any substance or material containing Salvia divinorum or Salvinorin A, to any person who is less than 18 years of age, is guilty of a misdemeanor punishable by imprisonment in a county jail not exceeding six months, or by a fine not exceeding one thousand dollars ($1,000), or by both that fine and imprisonment."

The amended bill was passed out from the Assembly Committee on Appropriations to 'Consent Calendar' with a recommendation 'Do Pass' (Ayes 16, Noes 0) on January 24, 2008, having passed the Assembly Committee on Public Safety (Ayes 7, Noes 0) the previous week.

Adams said he was initially asked to address the issue of Salvia divinorum by officials from the San Bernardino County Sheriff's Department. Lt. Barbara Ferguson, the department's legislative liaison, said "I am not real happy with the limited bill that we have. Our intention, when we started this, was to make it completely illegal. ... But because of how liberal the legislature is here in California, that was impossible to do. There will come a time when we can completely outlaw it here in California."

It was reported that Anthony Adams had met Kathy Chidester during discussions over the bill. Kathy Chidester believes salvia was a contributing factor to her son's suicide, which occurred in January 2006. She argued for an outright ban in her home state of Delaware. Schedule I classification was introduced there three months after the teenager's death in the form of "Brett’s law". Since then Kathy Chidester has campaigned more widely to see bans introduced in other states.

Adams's amended bill restricting the sale to minors passed unanimously in the Assembly on January 29, 2008 (Ayes: 76, Nays: 0). It passed in the Senate on July 2, 2008 (ayes: 23, nays: 5). Governor Arnold Schwarzenegger (R) signed the bill into law on July 22, 2008. It went into effect on January 1, 2009.

=== Delaware ===
On January 23, 2006, Delaware teenager, Brett Chidester took his own life by climbing into a tent with a charcoal grill where he died of carbon monoxide poisoning. In an essay found after his death, he wrote "Salvia allows us to give up our senses and wander in the interdimensional time and space…Also, and this is probably hard for most to accept, our existence in general is pointless. Final point: Us earthly humans are nothing." Even though it was written earlier, Brett's notes have subsequently been presented in media reports as if they were part of his suicide note. Brett's suicide note did not mention salvia. There are arguably more relevant factors, with the extent and significance of Brett's use of alcohol being a matter of contention Talk:Brett Chidester, and with it being reported that Brett had been suffering from depression. Given the details of Brett's suicide, in particular its premeditated nature and slow method, it is unlikely that he was immediately under Salvia divinorum's influence at the time of his death. There have been no other reported cases of salvia-related suicides anywhere else in the world. Also, Brett had told his parents that he had actually ceased his experimentation with the plant.

Despite the doubts that have been expressed about the lack of evidence against salvia in this case, Senator Karen Peterson sponsored Senate Bill 259, "Brett’s law", which passed as state legislation classifying Salvia divinorum as a Schedule I controlled substance.

Senator Karen Peterson and Brett's parents Kathy and Dennis Chidester have subsequently continued to campaign for and support Schedule I legislation beyond their home state of Delaware.

=== Florida ===
Salvia divinorum is a Schedule I controlled substance in the state of Florida making it illegal to buy, sell, or possess in Florida. Its listing in Schedule I reads as follows:

35. Salvia divinorum, except for any drug product approved by the United States Food and Drug Administration which contains Salvia divinorum or its isomers, esters, ethers, salts, and salts of isomers, esters, and ethers, if the existence of such isomers, esters, ethers, and salts is possible within the specific chemical designation.

This reveals a certain level of incompetence or sloppiness in whoever wrote the statute since Salvia divinorum is a plant, not a chemical, and therefore cannot have isomers, esters, ethers, salts, nor salts of isomers, esters, or ethers. However, this is addressed on the next line of the statute with the listing of salvia A.

The Florida statute lists Salvia divnorum and salvia A as separate substances, thusly making possession of the plant illegal as well as the salts of isomers, esters, or ethers derived from the plant.

In March 2008 it was reported that Florida state Representative Mary Brandenburg had proposed a bill to make possession of salvia a felony punishable by up to five years in prison.

"As soon as we make one drug illegal, kids start looking around for other drugs they can buy legally. This is just the next one," said Brandenburg.

Florida state Senator Evelyn Lynn, who was on the committee to study the salvia bill, said salvia should be criminalized. "I'd rather be at the front edge of preventing the dangers of the drug than waiting until we are the 40th or more," she said.

The House bill number was HB 1363. It proposed including Salvia divinorum and salvinorin A on Florida's Schedule I list of controlled substances. There were also similar Senate bills SB340, and SB1612 proposed concurrently.

On April 16, 2008, HB1363 passed the House, and advanced to the Senate floor. On April 23, 2008, the bill unanimously passed the Senate by a vote of 39–0. Having passed both House and Senate, the bill was signed into law on May 29, 2008, by Governor Charlie Crist becoming effective July 1, 2008.

Representative Brandenburg has received political campaign contributions from beer, wine and liquor-related industries. Senator Lynn has received political campaign contributions from industries including tobacco companies and tobacco product sales, and beer, wine and liquor-related industries.

=== Georgia ===
On March 8, 2007, Senator John Bulloch, (R-Ochlocknee), filed Senate Bill SB295, which proposes that "It shall be unlawful to knowingly produce, manufacture, distribute, possess, or possess with intent to produce, manufacture, or distribute the active chemical ingredient in the hallucinogenic plant Salvia divinorum A" (sic).

Violation of the proposed law would be considered a misdemeanor under Georgia's code. It would not apply to "the possession, planting, cultivation, growing, or harvesting of such hallucinogenic plant strictly for aesthetic, landscaping, or decorative purposes".

Sen. John Bulloch reportedly saw a report on an Atlanta television news station about the increased use of Salvia divinorum. He was quoted as saying – "I thought, 'Why hasn't somebody already jumped on this?'" before filing Senate Bill 295. "I hurriedly got legislative counsel to draft the bill…Everything that I read about it is it's considered to be a hallucinogenic drug…A lot of the reading that I've found on it says that it gives a quicker and more intense high than LSD." Senator Don Thomas (R-Dalton), a physician and member of the reviewing Senate Health and Human Services Committee, was reported as saying—"I just know about the publicity of the dangers of it, and the use of it, so my first impression is to ban anything of that nature".

As of July 1, 2010, Georgia code lists salvinorin A as a dangerous drug, prohibiting its sale, distribution, and possession. The only exemption to this is the 'possession, planting, cultivation, growing, or harvesting of Salvia divinorum or Salvia divinorum A strictly for aesthetic, landscaping, or decorative purposes' O.C.G.A. § 16-13-72

=== Illinois ===
On January 19, 2006, Senator John J. Millner (R) introduced Senate Bill 2589, to the Illinois State Legislature. This bill sought to add Salvia divinorum to that state's list of Schedule I controlled substances. The Bill failed to pass as the session ended sine die (adjourned with no date set for resumption).

On January 26, 2007, Representative Dennis M. Reboletti (R) filed House Bill HB457 which proposed Schedule I classification for Salvia divinorum (including "the seeds thereof, any extract from any part of that plant, and every compound, [...] derivative, mixture, or preparation of that plant"). The bill does not mention the active chemical constituent salvinorin A. Daniel Siebert criticised this wording as being "absurdly broad in scope, for it implies that any substance extracted from Salvia divinorum (water, chlorophyll, whatever) would be treated as a Schedule I controlled substance under the proposed law."

In March 2007, news of the bill's passage on Reboletti's website alleged that salvia is a "powerful psychoactive plant which in appearance looks like marijuana but has the psychoactive properties of LSD". Reboletti said, "It's important that we in the legislature are proactive in protecting our children from highly addictive substances" and "For a drug to be classified as a Schedule 1 substance signifies that it's a highly dangerous and potentially lethal drug for its user. Hopefully, the passage of my bill will bring attention to "Magic Mint" and help law enforcement combat the future rise of this drug." Salvia divinorum article references and other sources indicate, however, that salvia does not look like marijuana. Its psychoactive properties are not like those of LSD, and that Salvia divinorum is not generally understood to be either addictive or toxic.

By May 22, 2007, HB0457 had received support from all 173 members in both bodies of the democratic majority Illinois General Assembly. It was sent to the Governor of Illinois, Rod Blagojevich (D), on June 20, 2007 and was signed into law on Friday August 17, 2007. The law came into effect on January 1, 2008.

In a statement given prior to the bill coming into effect Reboletti said, "I've seen the argument to legalize marijuana. It is a gateway drug, like salvia could be a gateway drug," and "We decided to move forward rather than waiting for someone to be killed because of it."

A critical editorial was published by the Chicago Sun-Times on the eve of Reboletti's law coming into effect. It commented – "Legislators must have been on something to zero in on this obscure organic substance ... The last time we checked, Illinois was not besieged by a salvia epidemic. We don't see the urgency in criminalizing a substance with no clear track record of causing people to act in a dangerous manner or hurt other people ... considering how overcrowded our prisons are with dangerous criminals, trolling around for more nonviolent drug offenders to punish is counterintuitive... Regulating use of, rather than banning salvia, would have been a more sober approach."

Alcohol-related financial contributions featured highly for Representative Dennis Reboletti's 2006 political campaign. According to OpenSecrets, 'Beer, Wine & Liquor' was his seventh highest industry contributor.

=== Indiana ===
A few days after a local TV news report aired in November 2007, a follow-up story reported that Representative Dennis Avery (D-Evansville) was interested in a possible ban. Representative Avery was quoted as saying – "I had never heard of this product until a very short time ago when 14 News brought it to my attention." The news report went on to say – "Several local drug prevention organizations and area law enforcement tell 14 News there hasn't been any indication salvia is a problem substance."

An online poll was conducted in connection with Indianapolis news channel's stories also in November 2007, asking the question – "Do you believe Indiana should regulate Salvia divinorum?" A majority of 76% of the polls respondents were opposed to outright prohibition (59% preferring age regulations, and 17% no restrictions at all).

On January 13, 2008, it was reported that State Representative Suzanne Crouch (R-Evansville) was proposing a bill that wants Indiana law rewritten to declare Salvia divinorum a Schedule 1 controlled substance. Crouch's proposal would make the manufacture, sale or possession with intent to deliver salvia a Class B felony, carrying a potential penalty of 6 to 20 years.

The offense would be a Class A felony if the delivery or sale of Salvia divinorum were to someone under age 18, on a school bus or within 1,000 feet of school property, a park, family housing complex or youth program center. A conviction for a Class A felony would carry a 50- to a life sentence. The bill has not yet been assigned to a committee.

Crouch was reported as saying – "The fact it has that kind of (hallucinogenic) reaction and is not illegal certainly caused me to look at it seriously".

An editorial published by the Evansville Courier & Press on January 15, 2008, asked – " Are the proposed penalties of decades in prison appropriate? It's easy to demand Draconian sentences, until it's your teenager who gets caught". It suggested that there were other, more pressing, concerns for Indiana's lawmakers during the 2008 legislative session, saying – "Crouch's bill instead should be referred to a study committee for hearings this summer, with an eye to considering it in the 2009 session. It's not as if we have an epidemic of Salvia divinorum abuse that requires immediate action."

Alcohol-related financial contributions featured highly for Representative Suzanne Crouch's 2006 political campaign. According to OpenSecrets, 'Beer, Wine & Liquor' was her eighth highest industry contributor.

=== Iowa ===
On January 18, 2007, the Governor’s Office of Drug Control Policy proposed two House/Senate Study Bills. Salvia divinorum and salvinorin A as Schedule I controlled substances. As of July 29, 2011, Governor Terry Branstad signed these bills into law, making Salvia divinorum a Schedule One Controlled Substance in Iowa.

=== Kansas ===
On January 18, 2008, Senate bill 481 was proposed to amend current Kansas state law to add Salvia divinorum and datura stramonium (jimson weed) to schedule I of the Kansas Controlled Substances Act. The fiscal note from the Division of Budget stated the passage of this bill would have no fiscal effect.

The proponents of the bill included Senator Peggy Mast; Tom Stanton, Kansas County and District Attorneys Association; and Teresa Walters, Emporians for Drug Awareness. There was no testimony in opposition to the bill.

On her website Peggy Mast (R) said - "A bill that would outlaw salvia has entered the Senate as well as one in the House. It looks positive that these bills will get the support needed in both chambers. This drug has become widely abused and it is time to pass legislation to make it illegal."

The bill was passed by the Senate (yeas 40 nays 0) on February 20, 2008 and moved on for review by the House Judiciary committee. The House voted in favor of the bill on March 27, 2008 (ayes: 122, nays: 1). On April 14, 2008, it was sent to Governor Kathleen Sebelius (D) for executive approval.

On April 24, 2008, the bill was signed into law by the Governor, making Kansas the 9th state to criminalize the possession, use, or sale of Salvia divinorum.

=== Kentucky ===
In February 2009, Representative Will Coursey (D-Benton) was reported as having introduced a bill that would make possession of Salvia divinorum a Class B misdemeanor, punishable by up to 90 days. Cultivation of Salvia divinorum would be a Class A misdemeanor, which could bring up to 12 months in jail. Trafficking in iuoy Salvia divinorum would also be a misdemeanor, and the penalty would depend upon the amount. House Bill 228 was referred to the House Judiciary Committee for consideration.

Representative Coursey said he heard about the drug in talking with youth group leaders in Western Kentucky who encouraged him to file the legislation. House Speaker Greg Stumbo (D-Prestonsburg) co-sponsored the bill. Stumbo said, "During my time in the legislature, and especially as attorney general, I have heard far too many stories of Kentuckians getting trapped in the drug culture, and it appears that salvia could be the next gateway drug for many. We need to stop that before it gets a foothold in the state."

Jennifer Brislin, a spokeswoman for the state Justice Cabinet, said the bill was something that they had been pushing. "We see it as a growing problem. We are just trying to stay ahead of the curve."

Representative Coursey said that Kentucky State Police officials and Van Ingram, acting director of Kentucky's Office of Drug Control Policy, are among the bill's proponents. "The last thing we need in Kentucky is another substance for people in Kentucky to be abusing," said Ingram.

Officer Chris Sutton, a spokesman for the Lexington police department, said they hadn't had any recorded complaints about salvia. But Sutton said the department supports the legislation because it aims to make the public safer, "If it has detrimental effects on its users, it concerns us." he said.

Effective June 8, 2011 KRS 218A.1451 stated: "Possession of salvia is a Class B misdemeanor" and that "A person is guilty of possession of salvia when he or she knowingly and unlawfully possesses salvia for human consumption."

Kentucky also has enacted a tax stamp law for controlled substances. Tax evasion is a felony.

=== Louisiana ===
Effective from August 8, 2005 (signed into law on June 28, 2005), Louisiana Act No 159 made 40 plants, including Salvia divinorum, illegal if sold for human consumption. It is still legal to own the plants. Simple possession of an illegal form of Salvia is a felony for which the maximum sentence is 5 years; production (even for personal use) or distribution (even for free) has a maximum sentence of 10 years and a minimum sentence of 2 years. In addition, the defendant can even be sentenced to hard labor for either offense.

=== Maine ===
In December 2006, Rep. Chris Barstow proposed legislation for the State of Maine. According to reports Barstow believes salvia "is a drug very similar to LSD" and "We need to have it banned as soon as possible." Barstow's initial bill proposed that Salvia divinorum be broadly classed the same as marijuana (classified as 'Schedule Z' in Maine). Under the proposed bill possession of Salvia divinorum is a 'Class E' crime, and trafficking or furnishing of Salvia divinorum is a 'Class D' crime.

Barstow's action followed an approach from Kimberly A. Johnson, director of the Maine Office of Substance Abuse, after she had seen Salvia divinorum on sale in her home town of Gorham. Johnson indicated that she would not be satisfied with only the enforcement of age restrictions to control salvia, asserting—"This drug is just as dangerous to someone who's 30 as someone who's 17".

Lawmakers on the Criminal Justice Committee amended the proposed bill on February 6, 2007. The amendment proposed regulating salvia only for minors, so that selling or providing Salvia divinorum to anyone under the age of 18 would be a criminal offense. Possession by a minor would be a civil violation, punishable by a fine and community service. Adults 18 and over could continue to legally purchase and use the herb.

According to news reports, several committee members at the work session questioned the need to criminalize a drug that had not been causing a problem and apparently has little or no addictive potential.

The amended measure was signed by the governor on May 15, 2007. It was "Passed to be enacted" (last Senate action) on September 5, 2007.

=== Maryland ===
On January 28, 2008, Councilwoman Belinda Conaway (D), together with several fellow Democrat cosponsors, introduced Bill No. 08-0032 and Bill No. 08-0006R to the Baltimore City Council. These bills sought to prohibit the sale, possession, and use of salvia. Conaway said she was not aware of a problem in Baltimore City, but she wanted "to be on the front end." Other Maryland officials said they did not see salvia use as a widespread problem. The bills did not make it out of committee.

On January 14, 2009, Senator Richard Colburn (R) introduced Senate Bill 9 to the Maryland State Legislature. If enacted, this bill would make Salvia divinorum a Schedule I controlled substance in that state. The text only mentions Salvia divinorum it does not mention salvinorin A. The bill was co-sponsored by delegates Adelaide C. Eckardt (R-37B-Dorchester), and Jeannie Haddaway (R-37B-Talbot).

Haddaway said members of the Worcester County Commissioners brought the issue to her and Colburn that salvia was available without restriction at several Boardwalk retailers. "It's considered by most scientists to be more potent than LSD, and it's readily accessible to anyone in the state of Maryland who wants to purchase it. All around us, states are restricting it or banning it, and in Maryland you can still get it. Young people who may not have ever tried drugs before can legally purchase this and not realize how potent this is or what the effect is going to be."

Colburn noted the hundreds of thousands of videos posted on the Web site YouTube showing people under salvia's influence, saying, "It's nothing short of disturbing. Watch it for yourselves. See how they lose all coordination, experience emotional swings, dizziness and nausea. Now, imagine that person is your child or grandchild."

Salvia was blamed for the suicide of Delaware teen Brett Chidester in January 2006, shortly after which Delaware became the first state to outlaw salvia under what was dubbed "Brett's Law". His mother, Kathleen Chidester, has advocated for similar laws across the United States. "My hope and goal is to have salvia regulated across the U.S. It's my son's legacy and I will not end my fight until this happens." she said in written testimony in support of Colburn's bill. With over 4,000 teen suicides in the US per year, there is no way conclusively to determine if Salvia divinorum caused this suicide.

Colburn was reported as saying it's possible the bill could be amended to regulate salvia, rather than ban it outright, depending out how the bill escapes from committees.

The bill has opposition from the Drug Policy Alliance in Maryland, which called it an "unwarranted extension of the U.S. war on drugs". Naomi Long, director of the group's Washington metro area branch, urged legislators to reject the proposal, calling salvia's medical value "very promising" for treating health issues from depression and eating disorders to HIV infections. She also warned that if criminalized, salvia could be driven underground. Long said "the most effective approach" would combine age controls with restrictions on who could sell it, and where it gets placed in a store. She said lawmakers should model salvia regulations after tobacco laws, which, along with education campaigns, she said led to a dramatic drop in cigarette use among preteens since 1999. "We didn't have to criminalize tobacco or create long prison sentences for cigarettes to achieve these amazing results," she said. "The decrease was due to quality, comprehensive education at all grade levels about the health consequences of smoking and strict laws about sales to minors. This approach is working for tobacco."

=== Massachusetts ===
On May 16, 2007, Representatives Viriato deMacedo (R) and Daniel Webster (R) introduced House Bill 4434 to the Massachusetts State Legislature. If enacted, this legislation would have made Salvia divinorum and salvinorin A Class C controlled substances in that state. However, the bill status indicates that on June 15, the House Committee recommended it ought not to pass (under Joint Rule 10), and a closing entry (January 2009) suggests no further action. On January 12, 2009, Representatives Viriato deMacedo (R) and Daniel Webster (R) reintroduced bills to make Salvia divinorum and salvinorina A Class C controlled substances. These bills are House Bill 1336, House Bill 1789, and House Bill 2037.

A town law, enacted by the town's board of selectmen in April 2008, prohibits the sale of Salvia divinorum in the Town of West Bridgewater, Massachusetts.

==== Boston ====
Boston Municipal Code 16-54 states, in part, that "No person shall sell, offer for sale or possess Salvia divinorum or salvinorin A within the City of Boston." This ordinance was adopted in 2009.

In January 2009, Boston City Councilor Rob Consalvo called for Boston to outlaw Salvia divinorum. "I’m scared by this," Consalvo said. "I can see this being the new meth if we don’t get our arms around it." Consalvo, was reportedly outraged that the state legislature has failed to pass a bill making Salvia divinorum illegal in 2008, so filed his own legislation in the city council that would make selling or possessing salvia in Boston a crime punishable with a $300 fine.

The report went on to quote Sharon Levy, medical director of adolescent substance abuse at Children’s Hospital, "There’s no reason for kids to use this product. It’s a dangerous substance for kids to experiment with." The credibility of such statements are suspect though, considering that developmental studies on Salvia divinorum use have not been conducted. Also, salvinorin A produces dysphoria as well as hallucinations, thus making it less likely for users to chronically use it. As far as safety is concerned, it is not possible to lethally overdose on salvinorin A using the common methods of ingestion (smoked/intrabuccal/sublingual/oral). However, the actions of people under the influence of salvinorin A could lead to serious harm (running, falling, drowning, crashing a vehicle, etc.), which is why traditional use suggests having other people present during its use to restrain the user if necessary. In regards to safety in terms of addiction, unlike more traditional hallucinogens like LSD and mescaline, salvinorin A affects kappa Opioid receptors and is noted for its reverse tolerance. As such, using Salvia divinorum decreases tolerance to salvinorin A and makes dysphoria more likely with continual use (this effect can turn people away from its use). Thus, like most hallucinogens, salvinorin A has low abuse potential.

Elaine Driscoll, a Boston Police Department spokeswoman, said the Hub "has not experienced widespread usage of this substance, however, it is always a good idea to get in front of an issue before it becomes a problem."

=== Michigan ===
On April 16, 2010, Representative Rick Jones submitted house bill HB6038, which proposes Schedule I classification of a number of substances including Salvia divinorum and salvinorin A in the state of Michigan. The bill was passed by the House on June 23, 2010 (Yeas: 105 Nays: 1) and after minor changes, approved by the Senate (YEAS 36 NAYS 0 EXCUSED 1 NOT VOTING 1) on September 22, 2010. The bill was signed into law by Governor Granholm September 30, 2010 and took effect October 1, 2010.

=== Minnesota ===
On February 28, 2008, Representative Joe Atkins introduced House bill HF2949 which proposes that Salvia divinorum be added to schedule IV of the controlled substance schedules in Minnesota. Atkins was reportedly concerned that "It's becoming a drug of choice for college kids on campus, because it's legal and readily available."

Matt Snyders, a journalist for the Minneapolis newspaper City Pages, tried Salvia divinorum for himself as part of his journalistic investigations. On April 9, 2008, he told of calling Representative Atkins and inviting him to do the same in order to research the issue more thoroughly. Snyders argued that Atkins would "be able to brandish his position with more credibility were he to experience the "drug" firsthand." Representative Atkins reply was "Frankly, it's not something that I have a considerable amount of time to do. Even if I wanted to." Snyders then asked "What if only I smoked it? Would you at least want to observe the effects?"

"Not particularly," Atkins said. Snyders report concluded:

Ultimately, it's this fundamental disconnect that accounts for the misunderstanding surrounding Salvia. As has been the case with other mind-expanding substances, the inability and unwillingness to differentiate between "psychedelically potent" and "socially dangerous" has spawned quixotic efforts to dispose of a natural plant via government prohibition.

— Snyders 2008-04-09 (US Media)

A companion bill (Senate Bill 2668) was also introduced by Senator Steve Murphy (D) in 2008. Both bills died with the dissolution of the 85th legislative session.

In February 2009, another bill (HF 484) was put up for consideration in the Minnesota House that would make Salvia divinorum a Schedule I controlled substance in Minnesota, making sales and possession of the plant a crime. Rep. Morrie Lanning (R-Moorhead) is given as the primary author of the bill, with co-authors Rep. Joe Atkins (D-Inver Grove Heights), Rep. Steve Smith (R-Mound), Rep. Paul Marquart (R-Dilworth) and Rep. Tony Cornish (R-Good Thunder). A Senate companion bill (SF 569) was authored by Sen. Bill Ingebrigtsen (R-Alexandria), with co-authors Sen. Julie Rosen (R-Fairmont), Sen. Joe Gimse (R-Willmar), and Sen. David Hann (R-Eden Prairie). The proposed bill did not pass a committee vote and thus died before making it to the floor.

The following year, February 2010, another bill (HF2975) was introduced that would make sale and possession a gross misdemeanor, once again authored by Lanning, with co-authors Atkins, Cornish, Rep. Steve Smith (R-Mound), Rep. Denny McNamara (R-Hastings), and later by Karla Bigham (D-Cottage Grove). A companion bill (SF2773) authored by Ingebrigtsen and Rosen in the Senate additionally would make salvinorin A sale and possession illegal. In response to the opposition, Ingebrigtsen said, "We still have to go to battle every day. We don't want a state of euphoria walking around us."

Both bills prevailed in committee votes, but the House bill was postponed indefinitely due to wording not being identical (the Senate bill also makes salvinorin A illegal). On April 29, 2010, the Senate bill passed 61–6 and was passed by the House 116-15 on May 13, 2010. The bill was signed by Governor Pawlenty on May 18, 2010, making sale a gross misdemeanor and possession a misdemeanor, effective August 1, 2010.

=== Mississippi ===
Senator Hob Bryan (D) proposed adding Salvia divinorum to Mississippi's Schedule I list of controlled substances in January 2008. The bill sailed through the senate unopposed (Yeas 52, Nays 0), similarly through the House (Yeas 118, Nays 0), and was approved by the governor on April 15, 2008. The law became effective July 1, 2008.

After the law had passed, it was reported that Attorney General Jim Hood was sending warnings to Mississippi business owners that it was no longer legal to sell Salvia divinorum. The Madison County Herald told how local law enforcement raided one store and took all of the salvia stock. The business owner claimed he was unaware that it was now against the law to sell salvia. The Attorney General said, "Many local law enforcement officers are going around and removing salvia from stores within their respective jurisdictions. If the stores have the product, they are given a warning and notified of the recent changes in the law. If they are caught a second time, they will face charges."

=== Missouri ===
On January 5, 2005, Representative Rachel L. Bringer introduced House Bill 165 to the Missouri State legislature. This bill sought to add Salvia divinorum to that state's list of Schedule I controlled substances. Despite the CCLE sending a letter to Representative Bringer advising of its earlier report to Congress, the following month saw the introduction of House Bill 633, which sought to place Salvia divinorum and salvinorin A in Schedule I and also proposed to add 12 other substances to Missouri's list of controlled substances. This second bill was introduced on February 23, 2005, by Representative Scott A. Lipke (R) and Representative Bringer. On August 28, 2005, the bill was incorporated into section 195.017 of the state's drug regulation statutes. Thus, Salvia divinorum became a Schedule I substance in the state of Missouri. Possession is a Class C felony under MRS 195.202, which allows a maximum sentence of 7 years.

=== Nebraska ===
Attorney General Jon Bruning's office planned to pursue a bill to make Salvia divinorum illegal during Nebraska's 2008 legislative session.

In a press release aired by Nebraska TV he was reported as saying – "Salvia is a powerful hallucinogen that can be purchased legally. This legislation will make it illegal and put it on par with other powerful drugs like peyote, psychedelic mushrooms and LSD," [...] "Several other states have already made salvia illegal. It's time to add Nebraska to the list."

Senator Vickie McDonald supported the legislation, saying – "Videos of teens using this common plant to get high have become an internet sensation," [...] "Nebraska needs to classify Salvia divinorum and its active ingredient, salvinorin A, as a controlled substance in order to protect our children from a drug being portrayed as harmless when it's not."

The bill proposed addition of Salvia divinorum to Schedule I of the Nebraska Uniform Controlled Substances Act. Possessing salvia would have been considered a Class IV felony with a penalty of up to five years. Trafficking would have fallen under a Class III felony with up to a 20 year penalty.

In TV reports Senator Vickie McDonald said – "Anytime anything's on YouTube it's an issue," and "Legislators, parents, grandparents, we need to be on top of these things," [...] "We need to protect our children and this is one way we can do it."

Senator Vickie McDonald's second highest political campaign contributions from industry groups in 2006 came from "Beer, Wine & Liquor"-related industries. Her third highest campaign contributors in 2006 came from industries related to "Tobacco companies & tobacco product sales".

The proposed bill was submitted to the Nebraska legislative process as bill number LB840 on January 10, 2008. However, its status was updated in April 2008, showing on the Nebraskan legislature website as "Indefinitely postponed".

In January 2009, it was reported that the Nebraska legislature had voted 44–0 in favour of bill LB 123, proposing Salvia divinorum as a Schedule I controlled substance. The bill's sponsor Sen. Russ Karpisek (R-Wilbur) said, "Please, think about our children when you think about this one. It's another gateway drug. I think that it will entice people to use the drug and see what it's like. Scary thought to me."

It was reported in June 2008, that a Nebraskan store owner was being prosecuted for selling Salvia divinorum at his store. Proposed bills specific to Salvia divinorum had not passed into law. However, Christian Firoz was cited under a more general Nebraskan statute where it is illegal to sell a product to induce an intoxicated condition. (Note: Firoz was charged with knowingly selling an intoxicating compound in violation of Nebraska Statutes; sections 28-419 and 28-420. In section 28-419 intoxicated conditions are deemed to include "stupefaction, depression, giddiness, paralysis, inebriation, excitement, or irrational behavior, or in any manner changing, distorting or disturbing the auditory, visual, mental or nervous processes". Note that section 28-421 of Nebraska's Statutes provides exception for alcohol - "The provisions of sections 28-419 to 28-424 shall not apply [...] to the use or sale of alcoholic liquors as defined by section 53-103.")

Susan Kirchmann, Firoz's lawyer, argued that statute is too vague and is unconstitutional – "The law can't be fairly interpreted. It can be interpreted in so many different ways so that anyone that looks at that statute looks at in one way, another person looks at it at another, the next person looks at it in a different way. Because it can be interpreted in many different ways, it doesn't give a person fair notice of what is acceptable behavior or not in this state".

Firoz said salvia is a herbal meditation supplement and that everyone has a right to have it.

However, in September 2008, it was reported that the state's argument, i.e. that "Firoz was not selling cleaning chemicals with no idea they were to be used to get high. Instead, he was knowingly selling salvia his purchasers would use to become intoxicated" had been sided with by Lancaster County Judge Gale Pokorny. In a September 10 order, Pokorny ruled that Firoz must stand trial because he knew what he was selling – "This judge is of the opinion that Mr. Christian Firoz knew precisely that the Salvia Divinorum he was selling was a 'substance' his purchasers were buying intended for human ingestion for the sole purpose of achieving mind-altering intoxication. While there may be others who potentially might be caught up in some confusing terminology contained in these two statutes, Mr. Christian Firoz does not appear to be one of them."

The report said Firoz was to go on trial for unlawfully selling a legal substance in October 2008. He faced up to three months in jail and a $500 fine. It was, however, reported in February 2009, that the jury had returned a verdict of not guilty in this case.

=== New Jersey ===
On April 6, 2006, Assemblywoman Linda Stender (D) announced that she was proposing legislation to ban Salvia divinorum. On May 15, 2006, Senator Stephen Sweeney] (D) proposed Senate Bill 1867 to the state senate. Assemblywoman Stender introduced an identical bill to the State Assembly on May 22, 2006. It is designated Assembly Bill 3139 and is cosponsored by Assemblyman Jack Conners (D) and Assemblyman Herb Conaway (D). If passed, these bills would classify Salvia divinorum and salvinorin A as Schedule I controlled substances in New Jersey. Neither bill has come up for a vote.

As of April 18, 2009, there are still two bills seeking to criminalize salvia pending in the New Jersey Legislature. The bills, A-1323 and S-2436, are pending in the Assembly Judiciary Committee and Senate Judiciary Committee, respectively.

=== New Mexico ===
On January 21, 2009, Representative W. Ken Martinez introduced House Bill 144 to the New Mexico state legislature, sponsored by Representative Keith J. Gardner. If enacted, this legislation would have made Salvia divinorum and salvinorin A Schedule I controlled substances in New Mexico. It passed in the House of Representatives and was sent to the Senate, where it died with a status of Action Postponed Indefinitely. On February 3, 2011, Representative Zachary J. Cook introduced House Bill 336 to the state legislature, also seeking to add Salvia divinorum and salvinorin A to the list of Schedule I controlled substances in New Mexico. HB336 passed in the House of Representatives and was sent to the Senate, where it died with a status of Action Postponed Indefinitely. On January 27, 2014, Senator Sue Wilson Beffort introduced Senate Bill 127 to the legislature, again seeking to add Salvia divinorum and salvinorin A to the list of Schedule I controlled substances in New Mexico. The bill was never voted on, and was given a status of Action Postponed Indefinitely. New Mexico's list of controlled substances is found in New Mexico Statutes, chapter 30, article 31, also known as the "Controlled Substances Act".

=== New York ===
Salvia is currently legal in the state of New York. Bills to outlaw the sale and possession of Salvia have stalled in the state assembly. One such bill failed to pass during the 2005–06 session. In January 2011, State Sen. John J. Flanagan renewed attempts to have the substance criminalized by drawing attention to the alleged use of Salvia by mass murderer Jared Lee Loughner.

=== North Carolina ===
State Law 2009-0538 was signed into law by Governor Bev Perdue on August 28, 2009, and came into effect December 1, 2009. The bill makes it unlawful to manufacture, sell, deliver, or possess Salvia divinorum. A violation of the law on the first or second offense is subject to a fine of not less than twenty‑five dollars ($25.00). On a third or subsequent offense the person is guilty of a Class 3 misdemeanor. There is an exception that the law does not apply to (1) employees or contractors of any accredited college or school of medicine or pharmacy at a public or private university in North Carolina while performing medical or pharmacological research for such institution or to (2) possession, planting, cultivation, growing, or harvesting of a plant strictly for aesthetic, landscaping, or decorative purposes.

=== North Dakota ===
On January 15, 2007, Senators Dave Oehlke (R) and Randel Christmann (R), together with Representative Brenda Heller (R) proposed Senate Bill 2317 to classify Salvia divinorum as Schedule I controlled substance.

The original text of the bill only mentioned Salvia divinorum. The Senate Judiciary Committee amended this on April 5, 2007, changing the bill wording to include salvinorin A and "any of the active ingredients" of Salvia divinorum. Daniel Siebert has questioned this vague wording – "since it could be interpreted to include many commonly occurring pharmacologically active compounds, such as tannins, oleanolic acid, ursolic acid, etc". The amended bill passed in the Senate on February 7, 2007 (ayes: 47, nays: 0). It passed in the House on March 16, 2007 (ayes: 83, nays: 6). It was signed into law by Governor John Hoeven (R) on April 26, 2007. The new law went into effect on August 1, 2007.

==== Kenneth Rau ====
In April 2008, the case of Bismarck resident Kenneth Rau, a 46-year-old bottling plant worker, was reported as likely being the first person charged for Salvia divinorum possession in the United States. He was arrested on April 9, 2008, when police searched his home looking for his adult son, who was on probation for drug charges,

Burleigh County States Attorney Cynthia Feland confirmed, "He is being charged with possession of salvia with intent to deliver". Rau suggested that this is a long used drug prosecutors ploy "to make dealers out of everyone," saying of his untreated leaf, "Nobody wants leaves. Everyone is buying those 10X and 20X and 30X extracts." [...] "I bought eight ounces of leaf on eBay by bidding $32 for it. Now they're charging me with possession with intent." [...] "This is ridiculous since an ounce is clearly the standard saleable unit for [untreated] leaf."

Rau's interest in salvia was reported as deriving from a broader interest in herbalism, religion and spirituality. – "I read that salvia facilitates lucid dreaming, so I tried chewing some leaves before bed time, and it was interesting because I would see faces and remember names I had long forgotten." He also tried salvia as a cure for depression. "I have some childhood issues to deal with. They had me on Paxil," he said. "They want you to take their pharmaceuticals, but if you want to take an herbal remedy, they want to throw you in prison. Are they going to save me from myself by throwing me in prison for years?"

Rau said his arrest has motivated him. "Maybe this is an opportunity for me to join the fight. I've never been a drug user, never been arrested. I started experimenting with this stuff because, I thought it was legal. I didn't want to get into trouble, but now they're treating me just like some meth dealer." [...] "I've emailed the ACLU Drug Law Reform Project, but I haven't heard back from them yet."

The Drug Reform Coordination Network (DRCNet) reported that it had contacted Republican lawmakers, state Sens. Dave Oelke and Randel Christmann and state Rep. Brenda Heller, but none of the three legislators responded to requests for comment.

Assistant State's Attorney Cynthia Feland said that people contacting the Burleigh County State's Attorney's Office urging them not to continue with the prosecution would not have any effect on the case. "We can't pick and choose what to prosecute," she said.

Senator Randy Christmann admitted that he received, and continues to receive, e-mails from people across the country in favor of keeping Salvia divinorum legal, but said, "We felt there was no good reason to allow that to continue lawfully, I just feel it's a destructive thing without enough up-side to justify its use."

Kenneth Rau questioned why North Dakota needs to prohibit salvia when the federal government has not moved in a similar way, but Christmann reportedly felt that waiting for Washington to act was not in the best interests of North Dakota, saying, "I'm not one who usually relies too much on what the federal government tells me to do."

In April 2009, it was reported that Rau had been given a deferred sentence in relation to his salvia charge. He had pleaded guilty to the charge of Class C felony possession of salvia, Class A misdemeanor possession of drug paraphernalia and Class B misdemeanor possession of marijuana at the Burleigh County Courthouse. South Central District Judge Tom Schneider imposed a three-year deferred imposition of sentence for the salvia and drug paraphernalia charges and a two-year deferred imposition of sentence for the marijuana charge. Rau will be on supervised probation for three years, and the charges will be removed from his record if he successfully completes his time on supervision.

Burleigh County Assistant State's Attorney Cynthia Feland recommended a deferred sentence on the salvia charge saying that Rau had no recent criminal history, no history of prior drug use and bought the salvia over the Internet before its illegal status in North Dakota was widely known. Judge Schneider ordered Rau to complete a chemical dependency evaluation and any recommended treatment and pay $575 in court fees.

After the hearing, Rau said he was not surprised at the type of sentence he got. "It's kind of what I expected," he said. "I didn't think I would get any better from a jury trial."

=== Ohio ===
In May 2007, Representative Thom Collier (R) proposed House Bill 215 seeking to make Salvia divinorum a Schedule I drug in the state of Ohio. The bill passed unanimously (95–0) on April 16, 2008. The bill moved to the Senate, and passed unanimously (33–0) on December 16, 2008. The bill now moves to conference committee, and then to the governor.

On January 6, 2009, Gov. Ted Strickland signed a law which added Salvia divinorum to the Ohio controlled substances act. The law took effect 90 days from the day of the signature. Salvia divinorum is now a schedule I substance.

=== Oklahoma ===
Representative's John Nance (R) bill HB 2485 was passed into law in the State of Oklahoma on the May 26, 2006. The wording of the bill—"Salvia divinorum [that] has been enhanced, concentrated or chemically or physically altered" — means that its particular focus was on high-strength extracts, rather than untreated natural strength Salvia divinorum leaf or plants.

In 2008, the Oklahoma Bureau of Narcotics (OBNDD) was reported as working with Representative David Derby (R-Owasso), and Senator Jonathan Nichols (R-Norman), to enact House Bill 3148. Governor Brad Henry signed the measure into law June 2, 2008. The law comes into effect November 1, 2008 and classifies all forms of Salvia divinorum as Schedule I substances in Oklahoma. After that date, possession of Salvia divinorum will be a felony offense punishable by up to 10 years in prison, and distribution carries a penalty of 5 years to life in prison. Daniel Siebert described the penalties as draconian. OBNDD Director R. Darrell Weaver was reported as saying, "There is nothing good that comes from salvia and we will fight tirelessly to control such unwanted substances in Oklahoma."

=== Oregon ===
During the year 2003, two bills were proposed to criminalize Salvia divinorum and salvinorin A. Both bills died upon adjournment of the Oregon Judiciary Committee. House Bill 3485 (introduced March 15, 2003) sought to impose particularly severe penalties. If it had passed, possession would have been punishable by a maximum of 10 years imprisonment, a $200,000 fine, or both. Delivery would have been punishable by a maximum of 20 years imprisonment, a $300,000 fine, or both. Senate Bill 592 only proposed to make delivery a crime. If it had passed, delivery would have been punishable by a maximum of one year's imprisonment, a $5,000 fine, or both.

Efforts to ban Salvia divinorum were renewed on January 25, 2007. Representative John Lim (R) introduced House Bill 2494 to the Oregon State Legislature. If passed, this legislation would have made Salvia divinorum and salvinorin A Schedule I controlled substances in that state. Possession would be punishable by a maximum of 1 year's imprisonment, a $6250 fine, or both. Manufacture or delivery would be punishable by a maximum of 20 years imprisonment, a $375,000 fine, or both.

Rep. John Lim has been quoted as saying—"From what I understand this drug is at least as dangerous as marijuana or LSD", and Seth Hatmaker, a spokesman for Lim—"I think it's only a matter of time before we find people addicted to this stuff". There is little or no research evidence to support these views. In fact, the scientific consensus is mostly to the contrary. Salvia divinorum is not generally understood to be addictive.

House Bill 2494 died in committee upon adjournment on June 28, 2007.

In March 2011, the house considers a ban on salvia.

=== Pennsylvania ===
The Pennsylvania General Assembly website indicates three salvia-related bills in the 2007–2008 Regular Session. These are Senate bill 710 (P.N. 781), House Bill 1379 (P.N 1951) and House Bill 1379 (P.N. 1726). The different bills were introduced by different bill sponsors, but all proposed adding Salvia divinorum to Pennsylvania's Schedule I listing of controlled substances. House Bill No. 1547 also listed salvinorin A and divinorin A (salvinorin A is also known as divinorin A). Their last actions were recorded as: Referred to Judiciary, March 29, 2007 for Senate Bill 710; Referred to Judiciary, May 29, 2007 House Bill 1379; and, Referred to Judiciary, June 18, 2007 for House Bill 1547. House Bill 559, referred to judiciary on February 23, 2009, adding Salvia divinorum to the State's Schedule I Controlled Substances list, including its isomers. Salvinorin A is specifically banned by the act if derived from Salvia divinorum. A compound based on the molecular structure of salvinorin A is banned as an isomer. On September 29, 2010, the Pennsylvania House of Representatives passed an amended version of H.B. 176, which would place Salvia divinorum and salvinorin A under Schedule I of the PA Controlled Substance Act. HB 176 was referred to the Pennsylvania Senate Judiciary Committee on October 12, 2010. It was not voted on before the 2009–2010 session ended. There may be efforts to introduce the bill during the next session. Such a ban on Salvia divinorum might infringe on the religious rights protected by the Pennsylvania Constitution. On June 16, 2011, The Pennsylvania General Assembly passed Senate Bill 1006 which bans several drugs including Salvia divinorum, salvinorin A, and divinorin A, and presented the bill to the governor, who signed it on June 23, 2011.

=== South Carolina ===
On February 13, 2008, Representative Chip Huggins (R) introduced House Bill 4687 to the South Carolina State Legislature. If enacted, this legislation would make Salvia divinorum and salvinorin A Schedule I controlled substances in that state. On April 10, 2008, the bill passed in the House (ayes: 101, nays: 4). The bill later died with the dissolution of the 2007–2008 legislative session.

=== South Dakota ===
In February 2009, representatives voted was 67–2 in favour of House Bill 1090 which proposed adding Salvia divinorum to South Dakota's controlled substances list. "I'd like to have the drug off the street by the end of February," said Rep. Chuck Turbiville (R-Deadwood), the bill's prime sponsor.

Rep. Larry Lucas (D-Mission), amended the bill to give judges more discretion in sentencing. The Lucas amendment made possession of less than 2 ounces a misdemeanor, while 2 ounces or more would be a felony. Rep. Lance Russell (R-Hot Springs), said the Lucas amendment would penalize only for possession and wouldn't provide any penalty for distribution. Rep. Rich Engels (D-Hartford) said that flaw can be further addressed when the Senate next considers the bill.

In March 2009, it was reported that the South Dakota Legislature had given final approval, with the House voting 61–7 to accept changes the Senate had made in the bill. The bill went into effect immediately after it was signed by Gov. Michael Rounds (R) on March 11, as the bill had declared an "emergency" regarding salvia's use.

=== Tennessee ===
Tennessee has passed a law (SB3247/HB2909/TCA 39-17-452) that makes knowingly possessing, producing, manufacturing, distributing, or possessing with intent to produce, manufacture, or distribute the active chemical ingredient in the hallucinogenic plant Salvia divinorum a Class A misdemeanor. The law was to originally make it a felony, but it was amended. The Senate Bill was sponsored by Senator Tim Burchett (R-Knoxville). It was signed into law on May 19, 2006, and went into effect on July 1, 2006. Tim Burchett stated, "We have enough problems with illegal drugs as it is without people promoting getting high from some glorified weed that's been brought up from Mexico. The only people I’ve heard from who are opposed to making it illegal are those who are getting stoned on it."

Tennessee Code Annotated § 39-17-438 states that it is a Class D felony to possess Salvia divinorum for a first violation.

=== Texas ===
On March 3, 2007, Representative Charles "Doc" Anderson (R-Waco) filed House Bill 2347 which proposed the addition of salvinorin A and Salvia divinorum to Penalty Group 2 of the Texas Controlled Substances Act. On March 28, 2007, the Committee on Criminal Jurisprudence held a video recorded public hearing, 56 minutes 30 seconds into which HB2347 was raised.

Also in that month, on March 9, 2007, House Bill 3784, was introduced by Representative Tan Parker (R). That bill sought to add salvinorin A and Salvia divinorum to Penalty Group 3 of the Texas Controlled Substances Act.

Concurrently to Representative Anderson's proposed House bill, and on the same day as Representative Parker's House bill, Senator Craig Estes (R) filed Senate Bill 1796 on March 9, 2007. In contrast to the more restrictive House bills, the Senate bill simply proposed an age restriction—prohibiting the sale of Salvia divinorum to persons younger than 18 years of age.

Both House bills failed to make it out of committee. None of the bills were passed into law before the legislative session ended, although SB1796 bill did pass in the Senate by a voice vote of 31–0.

Representative Anderson resubmitted his proposal as House Bill 126 on November 10, 2008. He was quoted in the Waco Tribune-Herald as saying, "This substance is dangerous, incapacitating and serves no medical use whatsoever", and "If somebody is getting behind the wheel of a car or other situations where they could injure people, we need to make folks aware of it and start to control the access."

As happened previously in 2007, concurrently to Representative Anderson's re-proposed House bill, Senator Craig Estes filed Senate Bill 257, also on November 10, 2008. And once again, in contrast to the more restrictive House bill, the Senate bill simply proposed an age restriction—prohibiting the sale of Salvia divinorum to persons younger than 18 years of age. House Bill 470 of the 82nd Legislative Session sought to place Salvia divinorum on the list of Penalty Group 3 substances. However, the bill failed to make it out of the Senate Committee.

HB 124 was signed into law on June 14, 2013, and effective September 1, 2013, Salvia divinorum is prohibited as a Penalty Group 3 controlled substance under the Texas Controlled Substances Act.

=== Utah ===
KSL's Utah news channel broadcast a story on November 27, 2006, warning its viewers about what it called "this dangerous herb". The next day, on November 28, 2006, the same channel reported House Representative Paul Ray's "immediate response" with proposed legislation to ban Salvia divinorum in the State of Utah, quoting him as saying, – "It was upsetting to see we have a drug of that strength that's legal." and "We're basically going to make it illegal to possess or sell. Period." Ray's bill (HB190) proposed Schedule I classification.

On December 12, 2006, KSL editorial director Duane Cardall published a stance against Salvia divinorum on behalf of the news station as a whole. Cardall's piece closes: "In KSL's view, the legislature should take action to control the sale of Salvia divinorum before the illicit use of the accessible hallucinogen spreads. That wasn't done in a timely way with Meth, and now we have a devastating epidemic. Preemptive action now with 'Sally D' would likely spare countless families the horror of losing a loved one to the relentless tentacles of drug abuse."

KSL news stories and editorials generally support on-line comments from its registered readers. In this case, feedback was overwhelmingly in disagreement with the editorial line.

The House Representatives voted unanimously in favor of the bill however. On February 22, 2007, the bill status was 'House/ passed 3rd reading' (Yeas – 68, Nays – 0). But the bill did not get enacted during its legislative session and was instead sent to the House file for defeated bills on February 28, 2007.

The bill was scheduled to be re-introduced by Representative Paul Ray in a Law Enforcement and Criminal Justice Interim Committee meeting scheduled for September 19, 2007. On October 17, 2007, the Salt Lake Tribune newspaper reported that the proposal had been set aside. Representative Ray said that federal regulators had alerted him that they were close to reaching their own classification for Salvia divinorum. Nonetheless, Ray re-filed the proposed legislation on January 9, 2008, for consideration in the general legislative session. The 2008 bill was filed as Utah H.B. 260. This did not get enacted during its legislative session either.

In the 2009 Legislative session, Ray proposed the bill for a third time as H.B. 277. In a report supporting the 2009 bill, the local ABC news station described Ray as a former undercover narcotics officer who has been on a one-man crusade for three years at the capitol, trying to raise enough awareness to get his bill passed. "I’ve been trying for three years to make them aware," said Ray, "Most are waiting to see what the federal government is going to do. [...] We’ll hold committee hearings during the summer and I’ll bring this issue to the table again [...] This substance has absolutely no medical use whatsoever. It’s only used to get a cheap high." The news report closed by saying that Ray knew that it may take a while to get the attention of policy makers who spent most of the 2009 session rewriting some of the toughest liquor laws in America. (Note: In 2006 alcohol- and tobacco-related contributions amounted to the fourth largest industry contributions towards Representative Paul Ray's political campaigns.)

=== Virginia ===
Any material containing Salvinorin A (the primary psychoactive substance in Salvia Divinorum) is a Schedule I controlled substance in Virginia.

After a first failed attempt to outlaw Salvia divinorum, Delegate John O'Bannon introduced the bill which ultimately became law, HB21. On January 16, 2008, the Washington Times quoted O'Bannon as saying – "It is the opiate equivalent of LSD, and it usually causes bad trips". Other references suggest, however, that, while unpleasant experiences can occur, so called "bad trips" are the exception rather than the rule. The equivalence made with LSD is also inaccurate. Salvia divinorum is a selective κ (kappa) opioid receptor agonist. The term opiate incorrectly implies a derivative of opium. Virginians Against Drug Violence opposed the bill on the grounds that banning the drug would increase interest in using it.

The bill unanimously passed the house on January 16, 2008, and passed the Virginia State Senate unanimously on February 18, 2008. However, the bill had been slightly altered between the two versions. It originally listed both Salvia divinorum and salvinorum A (sic) as additions to Virginia's Schedule I classification. The version passed by the Senate (Yeas – 40, Nays – 0) had corrected the spelling of the active constituent salvinorin A, and did not list the plant Salvia divinorum. It was signed into Law on March 2, 2008, and the law became effective on July 1, 2008.

The news story suggested that the galvanizing incident in the overall movement to ban salvia was the suicide in January 2006 of 17-year-old, Brett Chidester. Kathy Chidester, Brett’s mother, is convinced it was salvia that made her son depressed, and is actively advocating for salvia criminalization. In a phone interview, Delegate O’Bannon said that Mrs. Chidester wrote him a letter to support the proposed salvia ban in Virginia. The interviewing journalist mentioned the seeming lack of connection between Brett's suicide and Salvia divinorum, to which O'Bannon reportedly snapped – "That’s not what his mother thinks".

The report went on to say that according to Laura Bechtel of Virginia's Blue Ridge Poison Center there had only been eleven calls about salvia in the past four years, only four of which were people who had actually ingested, the other seven being callers just seeking information. This was out of a total of 148,650 calls received by the center during that period. "As far as I know," Bechtel said, "we haven’t had any cases that needed medical attention."

=== Wisconsin ===
On February 15, 2007, the day after a Fox TV local news story on salvia had aired in Milwaukee, Wisconsin state lawmaker Sheldon Wasserman, also a licensed physician, spoke to Fox news in a follow-up report about his plans to introduce legislation to make salvinorin a Schedule I controlled substance. In the interview, he said – "it came to me as a complete... something totally new... I was kinda shocked" and went on to claim – "there is no medical purpose for this product, it is completely for getting high, getting stoned, and it is something that should not be out there and available".

On June 18, 2007, the Wisconsin State Journal newspaper ran a front page headline cover story about salvia, reporting that Representative Wasserman had recently begun seeking sponsors for a bill that would ban the manufacture and sale of Salvia divinorum for consumption in Wisconsin, with a penalty of up to $10,000. Wasserman was reported as saying – "This bill is all about protecting our children", and "I want to stop the Salvia divinorum dealers who are pushing young people to experiment with a potentially dangerous substance."

On August 7, 2007, Representatives Sheldon Wasserman (D), David Cullen (D), John Townsend (R), Mike Sheridan (D), Alvin Ott (R), Jake Hines (R), and Terese Berceau (D) introduced Assembly Bill 477 to the Wisconsin State Legislature. If passed, this bill would prohibit manufacturing, distributing, or delivering the active chemical ingredient in the plant Salvia divinorum (salvinorin A) with the intent that it be consumed by a person. Bill 477 died in session in early 2008.

Assembly Bill 186, created in April 2009, passed through three votes and as of February 17, 2010, returned to the Assembly successfully. A summary of the bill:

This bill prohibits manufacturing, distributing, or delivering salvinorin A, a psychotropic ingredient in the plant Salvia divinorum, with the intent that it be consumed by a person. However, the prohibition does not apply to manufacturing a form of salvinorin A that is recognized by the U.S. Food and Drug Administration as a homeopathic drug and that may be obtained from a retail store without a prescription, or to distributing or delivering such a form of salvinorin A to a person who is 18 years of age or older. The penalty for violating the prohibition is a fine not to exceed $10,000.

AB 186 was signed into law by Wisconsin governor Jim Doyle on March 3, 2010.

=== Wyoming ===
On February 13, 2006, Representative Stephen Watt (R) proposed adding Salvia divinorum to Wyoming's list of Schedule I controlled substances (House Bill 0049). The bill died without coming up for a vote.
