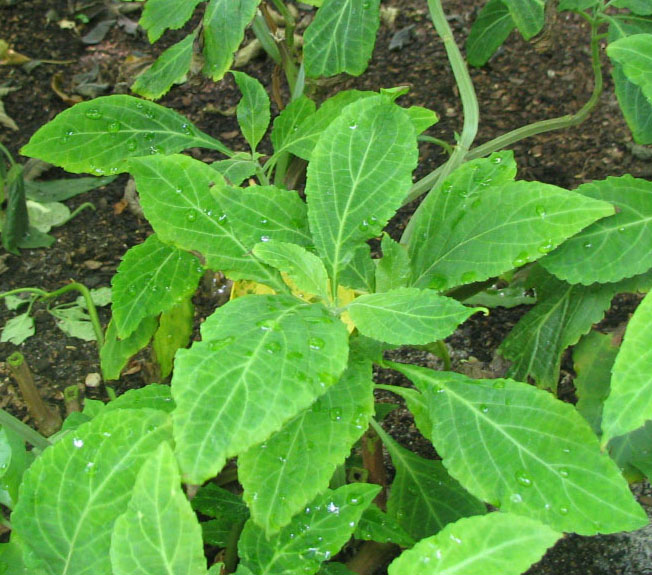
- Vegetative habit of Salvia divinorum

Scientific classification
- Kingdom: Plantae
- Clade: Tracheophytes
- Clade: Angiosperms
- Clade: Eudicots
- Clade: Asterids
- Order: Lamiales
- Family: Lamiaceae
- Genus: Salvia
- Species: S. divinorum

Binomial name
- Salvia divinorum Epling & Játiva
- Native distribution of Salvia divinorum in Southwest Mexico

= Salvia divinorum =

Species of plant

Salvia divinorum (Latin: sage of the diviners; also called ska maría pastora, seer's sage, yerba de la pastora, magic mint or simply salvia) is a species of plant in the sage genus Salvia, known for its transient psychoactive properties when its leaves, or extracts made from the leaves, are administered by smoking, chewing, or drinking (as a tea). The leaves contain the potent compound salvinorin A and can induce a dissociative state, other effects are: amnesia, delusion, confusion, anxiety and hallucinations.

Mazatec shamans have a long and continuous tradition of religious use of S. divinorum to facilitate visionary states of consciousness during spiritual healing sessions. A media panic in the Western world, especially in the United States c. 2007, centered on reports of video sharing of drug use on the internet, legal teenage use of the drug, as well as a teenage suicide in Delaware, despite it being "unclear" what role the drug played in the incident. S. divinorum is legal in some countries, including the U.S. at the federal level; however over half of U.S. states have passed laws criminalizing it.

Its native habitat is cloud forest in the isolated Sierra Mazateca of Oaxaca, Mexico, where it grows in shady, moist locations. The plant grows to over a meter high, has hollow square stems like others in the mint family Lamiaceae, large leaves, and occasional white flowers with violet calyxes. Botanists have not determined whether S. divinorum is a cultigen or a hybrid because native plants reproduce vegetatively and rarely produce viable seed.

Because the plant has not been well-studied in high-quality clinical research, little is known about its toxicology, adverse effects, or safety over long-term consumption. Its chief active psychoactive constituent is a structurally unique diterpenoid called salvinorin A, a potent κ-opioid agonist. Although not thoroughly assessed, preliminary research indicates S. divinorum may have low toxicity (high LD_{50}). Its effects are rapid but short-lived.

== History ==
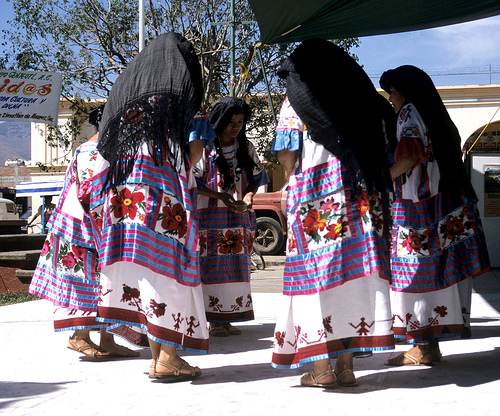
Mazatec people performing a ritual dance in Huautla de Jimenez

Salvia divinorum is native to the Sierra Mazateca in Oaxaca, Mexico, where it is still used by the Mazatec, primarily to facilitate shamanic visions in the context of curing or divination. S. divinorum is one of several plant species with hallucinogenic properties that are ritually used by Mazatec shamans. In their rituals, the shamans use only freshly harvested S. divinorum leaves. They see the plant as an incarnation of the Virgin Mary, and begin the ritual with an invocation to Mary, Saint Peter, the Holy Trinity, and other saints. Ritual use traditionally involves being in a quiet place after ingestion of the leaf—the Maztec shamans say that "La Maria (S. divinorum) speaks with a quiet voice."

It is also used in smaller amounts, as a diuretic, and to treat ailments including diarrhea, anemia, headaches, rheumatism, and a semi-magical disease known as panzón de borrego, or a swollen belly (literally, "lamb belly").

The history of the plant is not well known, and there has been no definitive answer to the question of its origin. Speculation includes Salvia divinorum being a wild plant native to the area; a cultigen of the Mazatecs; or a cultigen introduced by another Indigenous group. Botanists have also not been able to determine whether it is a hybrid or a cultigen.

=== Academic discovery ===
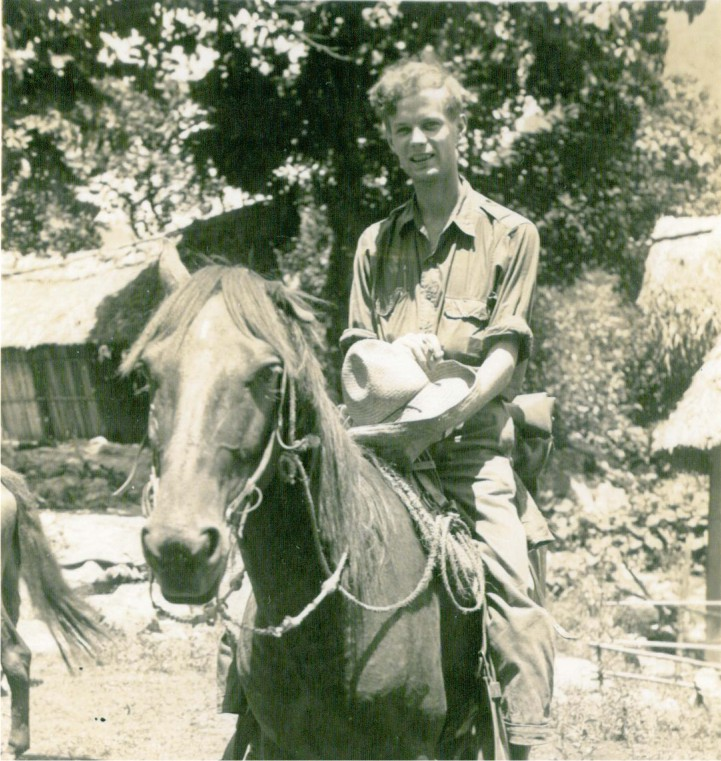
Jean Basset Johnson, who studied Mazatec shamanism during the 1930s

Salvia divinorum was first recorded in print by Jean Basset Johnson in 1939 while he was studying Mazatec shamanism. He later documented its use and reported its effects through personal testimonials of users. It was not until 2002 that Bryan Roth and his team identified the psychoactive mechanism.

Gordon Wasson tentatively postulated that the plant could be the mythological pipiltzintzintli, the "Noble Prince" of the Aztec codices. Wasson's speculation has been the subject of further debate amongst ethnobotanists, with some scepticism coming from Leander J. Valdés, and counterpoints more supportive of Wasson's theory from Jonathan Ott.

The identity of another mysterious Aztec entheogen, namely that of poyomatli, has also been suggested as being Salvia divinorum. Here too there are other candidate plants, notably cacahuaxochitl (Quararibea funebris),

== Description ==
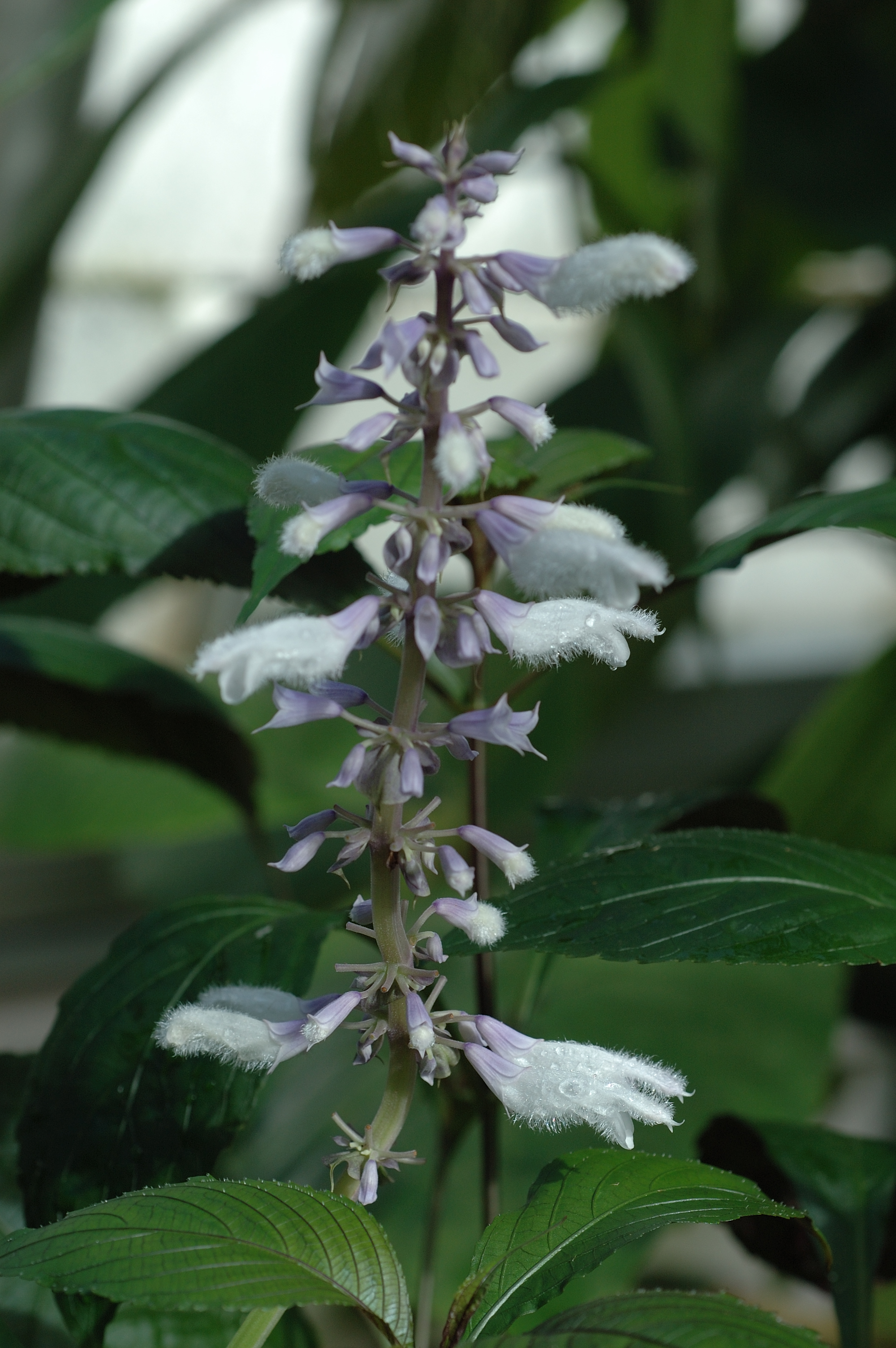
Flowering Salvia divinorum

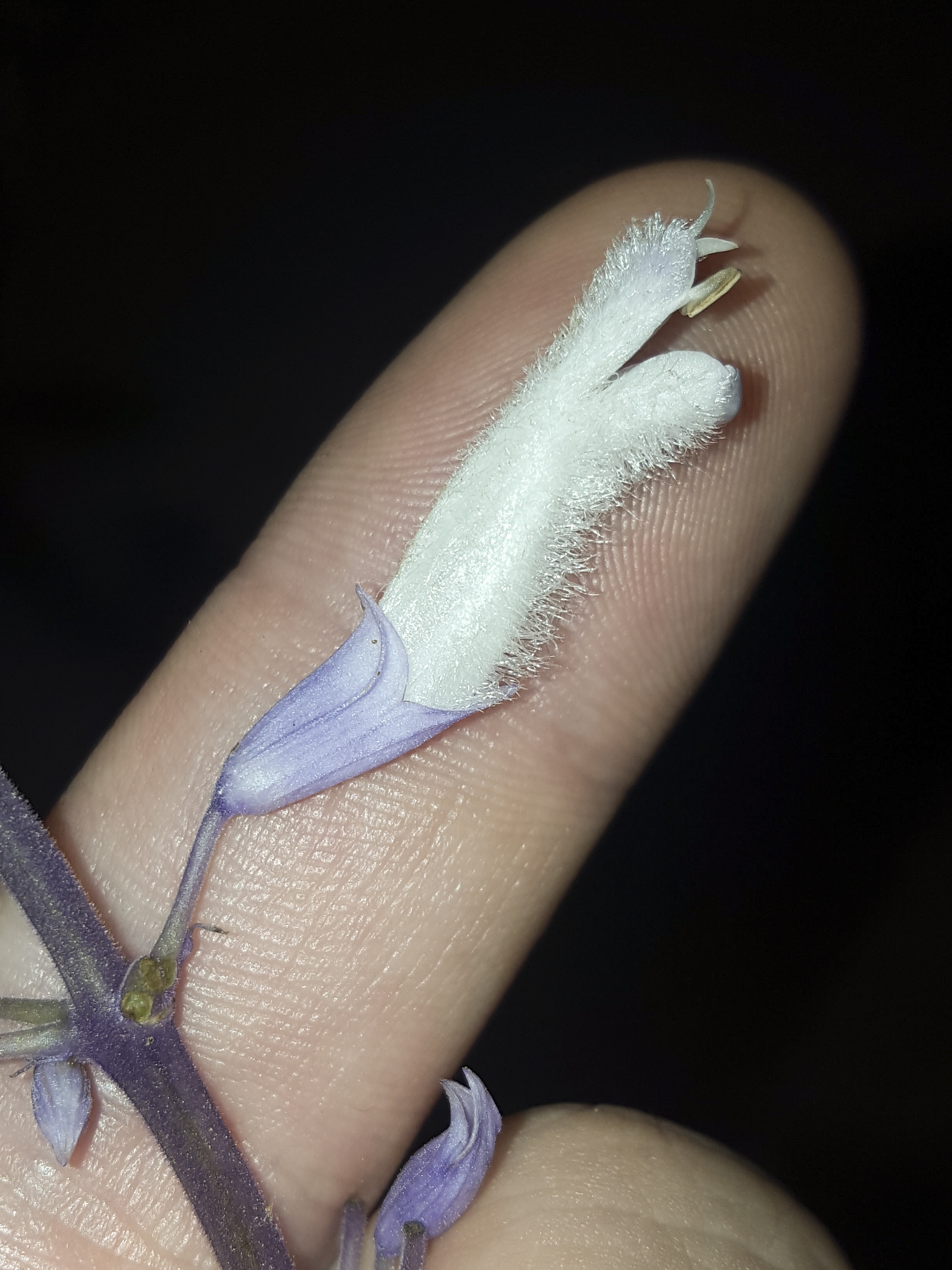
Flower detail, showing violet calyx and white corolla

Salvia divinorum has large green ovate (often also dentate) leaves, with a yellow undertone that reach 10 to 30 cm (4 to 12 in) long. The leaves have no hairs on either surface, and little or no petiole. The plant grows to well over 1 metre (3 ft) in height, on hollow square stems which tend to break or trail on the ground, with the plant rooting quite readily at the nodes and internodes.

The flowers, which bloom only rarely, grow in whorls on a 30-centimetre (12 in) inflorescence, with about six flowers to each whorl. The 3-centimetre (1 1/4 in) flowers are white, curved and covered with hairs, and held in a small violet calyx that is covered in hairs and glands. When it does bloom in its native habitat, it does so from September to May.

Early authors erred in describing the flowers as having blue corollas, based on Epling and Játiva's description. The first plant material they received was dried, so they based the flower color on an erroneous description by Hofmann and Wasson, who didn't realize that their "blue flowers, crowned with a white dome" were in fact violet calyces with unopened white corollas.

Salvia divinorum produces few viable seeds even when it does flower—no seeds have ever been observed on plants in the wild. For an unknown reason, pollen fertility is also comparatively reduced. There is no active pollen tube inhibition within the style, but some event or process after the pollen tube reaches the ovary is aberrant. The likeliest explanations are inbreeding depression or hybridity, although the latter was rejected in 2010. All of the Mazatec populations appear to be clonal. The plant's square stems break easily and tend to trail on the ground, rooting easily at the nodes and internodes.

== Taxonomy ==
Salvia divinorum was first documented in 1939; yet, it was many years before botanists could identify the plant due to Mazatec secrecy about the growing sites. Flowers were needed for a definitive identification of the species. In 1962, the Swiss chemist Albert Hofmann and ethnomycologist R. Gordon Wasson traveled throughout the Sierra Mazateca researching Mazatec rituals while looking for specimens of the plant. They were unable to locate live plants. Eventually, the Mazatec provided them some flowering specimens. These specimens were sent to botanists Carl Epling and Carlos D. Játiva, who described and named the plant as Salvia divinorum, in reference to its use in divination and healing by the Mazatec. By 1985, up to fifteen populations of the plant had been located.

Until 2010, there were differing opinions as to whether Salvia divinorum is an interspecific hybrid. The plant's partial sterility was suggestive of a hybrid origin, though no two parent species have been found with an obvious affinity to Salvia divinorum. One other possibility for the plant's partial sterility is that long-term cultivation and selection have produced an inbred cultigen. (Note: Botanist Valdés (1987), wrote that, "It is doubtful that the Salvia is a true cultigen", based partly on his belief that it was first "collected in the highlands and planted in more accessible places, where it becomes naturalized". The main cultigen proponent is Gordon Wasson, who is not a botanist.)

In 2010, a molecular phylogenetic approach by DNA sequencing of Salvia divinorum and a number of related species suggested that the species is not a hybrid. One earlier proposed parent was Salvia cyanea (a synonym for Salvia concolor), which Epling and Játiva believed to be closely allied to Salvia divinorum. (Note: Reisfield is unsure why Epling "used the invalid name (the synonym rather than the valid name S. concolor), nor why he considered this species close to S. divinorum".) The 2010 study demonstrated Salvia divinorum's closest relative to be Salvia venulosa—a rare and endemic Salvia that is native to Colombia, growing in shaded, wooded gullies at 1,500 to 2,000 m (4,900 to 6,600 ft) elevation. It also showed that Salvia divinorum does not belong to the Salvia section Dusenostachys, as believed earlier. The genetic study also indicated that Salvia venulosa was likely misplaced into Salvia section Tubiflorae, and that it may not be related to other Colombian Salvia species, though further tests are needed. A 2013 follow-up analysis of more Salvia species reported the same result.

The origin of Salvia divinorum was still a mystery as of 1993, one of only three plants in the extensive genus Salvia (approximately 900 species) with unknown origins—the other two being Salvia tingitana and Salvia buchananii.

=== Etymology ===
The genus name, Salvia, was first used by Pliny for a plant that was likely Salvia officinalis (common sage) and is derived from the Latin salvere. The specific epithet, divinorum, was given because of the plant's traditional use in divination. It is often loosely translated as "diviner's sage" or "seer's sage". Albert Hofmann, who collected the first plants with Gordon Wasson, objected to the new plant being given the name divinorum: "I was not very happy with the name because Salvia divinorum means 'Salvia of the ghosts,' whereas Salvia divinatorum, the correct name, means 'Salvia of the priests'." It is now in the botanical literature under the name Salvia divinorum due to priority rules.

=== Common names ===
There are many common names for S. divinorum, including sage of the diviners, ska maría pastora, seer's sage, yerba de la pastora, simply salvia, and colloquially sally-d and magic mint.

== Distribution and habitat ==
Salvia divinorum is endemic to the Sierra Mazateca in the state of Oaxaca in Mexico, growing in the primary or secondary cloud forest and tropical evergreen forest at elevations from 300 to 1,830 metres (980 to 6,000 ft). Its most common habitat is black soil along stream banks where small trees and bushes provide an environment of low light and high humidity.

== Cultivation ==
=== Propagation by cuttings ===
Salvia divinorum is usually propagated through vegetative reproduction. Small cuttings, between 5 and 20 cm (2 and 8 in) long, cut off of the mother plant just below a node, will usually root in plain tap water within two or three weeks.

=== Flowering ===
Blooms occur when the day length becomes shorter than 12 hours (beginning in mid-October in some places), necessitating the use of shade cloth in urban environments with exposure to light pollution caused by HPS lighting. Both Siebert and hobbyist reports indicate that viable seeds can, on occasion, be produced under cultivation, following hand-pollination or hummingbird pollination.

=== Strains ===
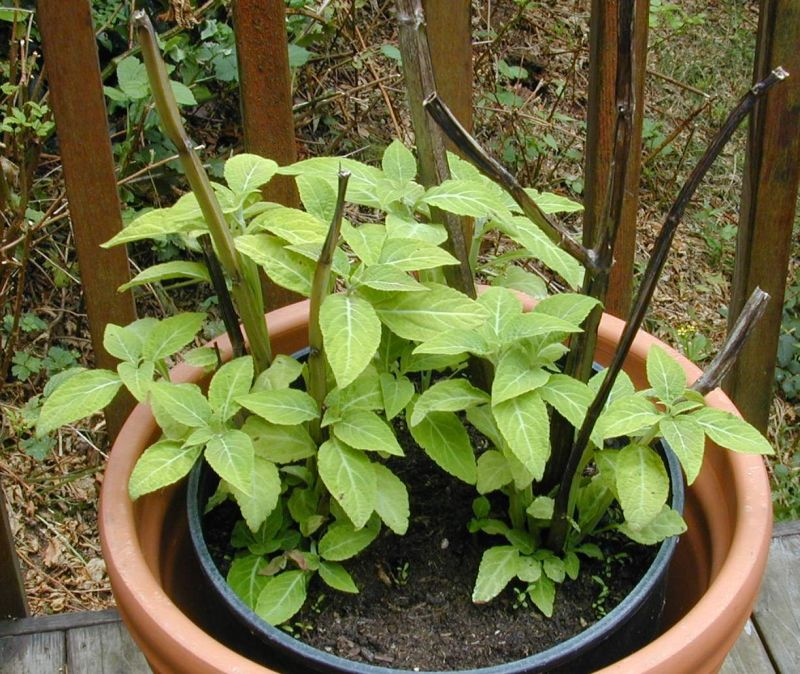
Three Salvia divinorum plants

There are two commonly cultivated strains which are known to be distinct. One is the strain that was collected in 1962 by ecologist and psychologist Sterling Bunnell (the Bunnell strain), colloquially mis-attributed as the Wasson-Hofmann strain. The other was collected from Huautla de Jiménez in 1991 by anthropologist Bret Blosser (the Blosser or Palatable strain). There are other strains that are not as well documented, such as the Luna strain (possibly Bunnell) isolated from a Hawaiian patch of Salvia divinorum clones, featuring unusually serrated and rounded rather than ovate leaves.

== Chemistry ==
Salvinorin A.

The known active constituent of Salvia divinorum is a trans-neoclerodane diterpenoid known as salvinorin A (chemical formula C_{23}H_{28}O_{8}). This compound is present in the dried plant at about 0.18%.

Salvinorin A is not an alkaloid (meaning it does not contain a basic nitrogen), unlike most known opioid receptor ligands. Salvinorin A is the first documented diterpene hallucinogen.

Similar to many psychoactive herbs, Salvia divinorum synthesizes and excretes its active constituent (salvinorin A) via trichomes, of the peltate-glandular morphology, located just beneath the cuticle (subcuticular) layer.

Other terpenoids have been isolated from Salvia divinorum, including other salvinorins and related compounds named divinatorins and salvinicins. None of these compounds has shown significant (sub-micromolar) affinity at the κ-opioid receptor, and there is no evidence that they contribute to the plant's psychoactivity.

=== Potency ===
By mass, salvinorin A "is the most potent naturally occurring hallucinogen." It is active at doses as low as 200 μg. Synthetic chemicals, such as LSD (active at 20–30 μg doses), can be more potent. Research has shown that salvinorin A is a potent and selective κ-opioid (kappa-opioid) receptor agonist. It has been reported that the effects of salvinorin A in mice are blocked by κ-opioid receptor antagonists. However, it is an even more potent D_{2} receptor partial agonist, and it is likely this action plays a significant role in its effects as well. Salvinorin A has no actions at the 5-HT_{2A} serotonin receptor, the principal molecular target responsible for the actions of 'classic' hallucinogens, such as mescaline and LSD, nor is it known to have affinity for any other sites to date.

In experiments, salvinorin A has shown little toxicity. Rodents chronically exposed to levels many times greater than those to which humans expose themselves show no signs of organ damage.

=== Other pharmaceutical action ===
Salvinorin A is capable of inhibiting excess intestinal motility (e.g. diarrhea), through a combination of κ-opioid and cannabinoid (mainly CB_{1} receptor) receptors in inflamed but not normal gut in vivo. The mechanism of action for Salvinorin A on ileal tissue has been described as 'prejunctional', as it was able to modify electrically induced contractions, but not those of exogenous acetylcholine. Results from a study at the University of Iowa indicate that it may have potential as an analgesic and as a therapeutic tool for treating drug addictions.

A pharmacologically important aspect of the contraction-reducing (antispasmodic) properties of ingested Salvinorin A on gut tissue is that it is only pharmacologically active on inflamed and not normal tissue, thus reducing possible side-effects.

== Ingestion ==
There are a few ways to consume Salvia divinorum. In traditional Mazatec ritual, shamans use only fresh Salvia divinorum leaves. Modern methods have been developed to more effectively absorb the active principle, salvinorin A. If enough salvinorin A is absorbed, an altered state of consciousness can occur. The duration of experience varies with the method of ingestion and the amount of salvinorin A absorbed.

=== Traditional methods ===
Mazatec shamans crush the leaves to extract leaf juices from about 20 to 80 or more fresh leaves (i.e. about 50–200 g or 2–7 oz). They usually mix these juices with water to create an infusion or 'tea' which they drink to induce visions in ritual healing ceremonies.

Chewing and swallowing a large number of fresh leaves is the other Mazatec method. Oral consumption of the leaf makes the effects come on more slowly, over a period of 10 to 20 minutes. The experience, from the onset of effects, lasts from about 30 minutes up to one and a half hours.

Doses for chewing vastly exceed doses used for smoking. By calculating the concentrations per leaf ("an average concentration of 2.45 mg per gram" of leaf), the average weight per leaf ("about 50 g" per 20 leaves, or 2.5 g/leaf), and the standard dose for chewing (about 8–28 leaves), the doses can range from about 50 mg to 172 mg.

=== Modern methods ===
Modern methods of ingestion include smoking or chewing the leaf, or using a tincture, as described in the following sections.

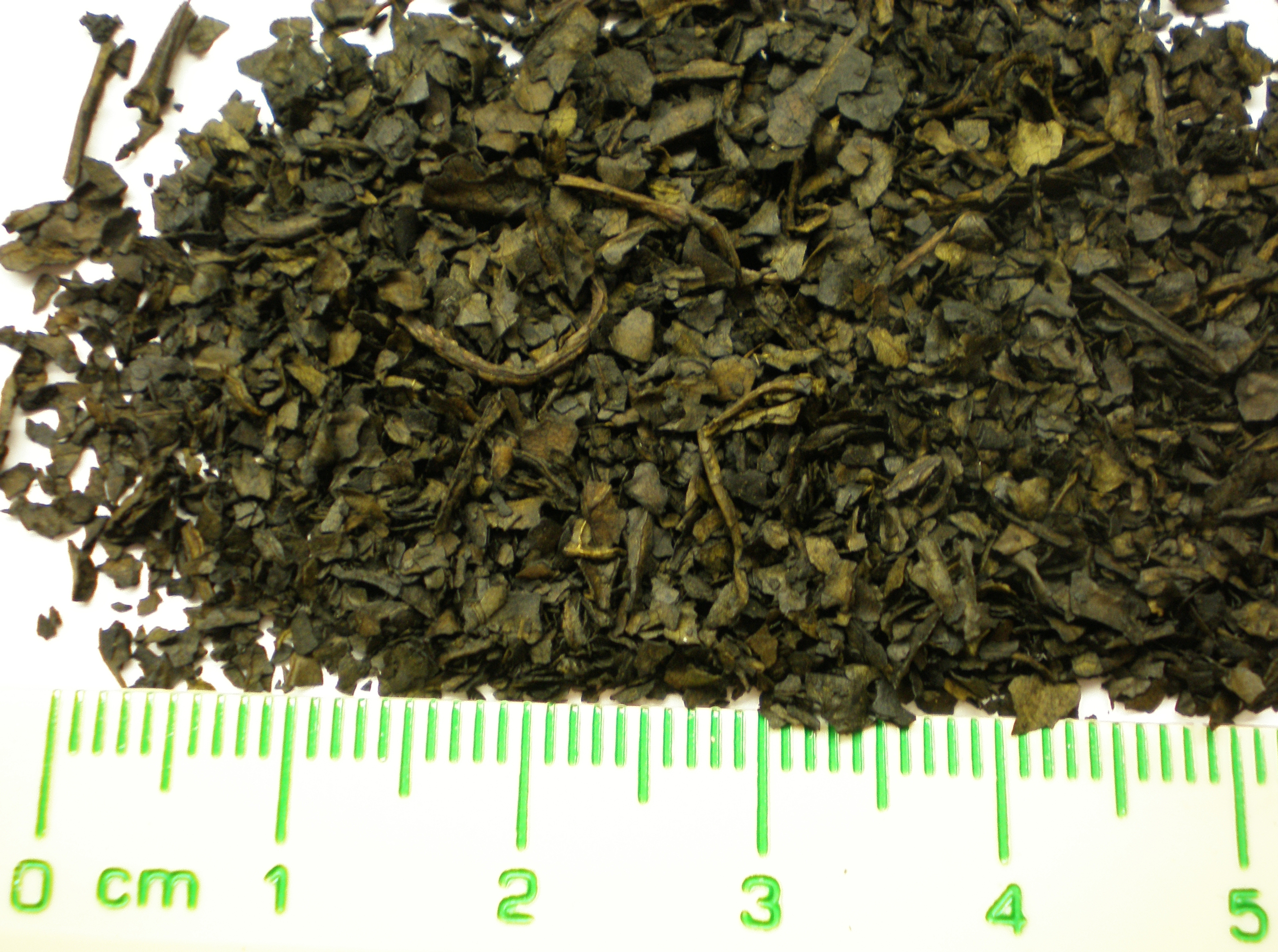
0.5 g. of 25x S. divinorum extract

Salvia divinorum is becoming more widely known and used in modern culture. The National Survey on Drug Use and Health, an annual US based survey sponsored by the Substance Abuse and Mental Health Services Administration (SAMHSA), for 2006 estimated that about 1.8 million persons aged 12 or older had used Salvia divinorum in their lifetime, of which approximately 750,000 had done so in that year. The following year, 2007, saw the annual figure rise from 750,000 to 1 million US users.

==== Smoking ====
Dry leaves can be smoked in a pipe, or through the use of a water pipe to cool the smoke. The temperature required to release salvinorin from the plant material is quite high (about 240 °C). A cooler flame will work, but the direct application of a more intense flame, such as that of a torch lighter, is often preferred.

Some find that untreated dry leaf produces unnoticeable or only light effects. Concentrated preparations or extracts which may be smoked in place of untreated leaves, have become widely available. This enhanced (or "fortified") leaf is described by a number followed by an x (e.g. 5x, 10x), the multiplicative factors being generally indicative of the relative amounts of leaf concentrate, though there is no accepted standard for these claims. Other sources may use a system of color codes to form their own standards of potency; for example, "green", "yellow", and "red."

These grades of potency may be roughly indicative of the relative concentration of the active principle, (salvinorin A), but the measure should not be taken as absolute. Overall extract potency will depend on the (naturally varying) strength of the untreated leaf used in preparing the extract, as well as the efficiency of the extraction process itself. Extracts reduce the overall amount of inhalations needed to ingest a given amount of active principle, thus facilitating more powerful experiences.

If Salvia is smoked, then the main effects are experienced quickly. The most intense 'peak' is reached within a minute or so and lasts for 1–5 minutes, followed by a gradual tapering off. At 5–10 minutes, less intense yet still noticeable effects typically persist, giving way to a returning sense of the everyday and familiar until back to baseline after about 15 to 20 minutes.

==== Quid chewing ====
The traditional method of chewing the leaves has continued in modern use. However, salvinorin A is generally considered to be inactive when orally ingested, as salvinorin A is effectively deactivated by the gastrointestinal system. Therefore, in what's understood to be a modern innovation, the 'quid' of leaves is held in the mouth as long as possible in order to facilitate absorption of the active constituents through the oral mucosa. 'Quid' refers to the fact that at the end of this method the user spits out the leaves rather than swallowing them because ingesting the leaves has no known effect. Chewing consumes more of the plant than smoking, and produces a longer-lasting experience.

==== Using a tincture ====
Less commonly, some may ingest Salvia in the form of a tincture. This is administered sublingually, usually with the aid of a glass dropper. It may be taken diluted with water just before use, which may slightly reduce the intensity of its effects, but can also serve to lessen or avoid a stinging sensation in the mouth caused by the presence of alcohol. Tinctures vary in potency, and the effects can range from inducing a mild meditative state to bringing about a more intense hallucinatory one.

When taken as a tincture the effects and duration are similar to other methods of oral ingestion, though they may be significantly more intense, depending on extract potency.

== Effects ==
Common effects of Salvia Divinorum

Aside from individual reported experiences, there has been a limited amount of published work summarizing salvia divinorum's effects. A survey of salvia users found that 38% described the effects as unique in comparison to other methods of altering consciousness. 23% said the effects were like yoga, meditation, or trance. Users have written prose about their experiences; some describing their visions pictorially, and there exist examples of 'salvia-inspired' visionary art. Others claim musical inspiration from the plant.

=== Near-death experience ===
A 2019 large-scale study found that ketamine, Salvia divinorum, and DMT (and other classical psychedelic substances) are linked to near-death experiences.

=== Vaporization ===
Ethnobotanist Daniel Siebert cautions that inhaling hot air can be irritating and potentially damaging to the lungs. Vapor produced by a heat gun needs to be cooled by running it through a water pipe or cooling chamber before inhalation.

=== Research (US) ===
In 2007, an ABC news report said excitement over research into salvia "could vanish overnight if the federal government criminalized the sale or possession of salvia, as the Drug Enforcement Agency [sic] is considering doing right now." Scientists worry that such legislation would restrict further work.

== Controversy ==
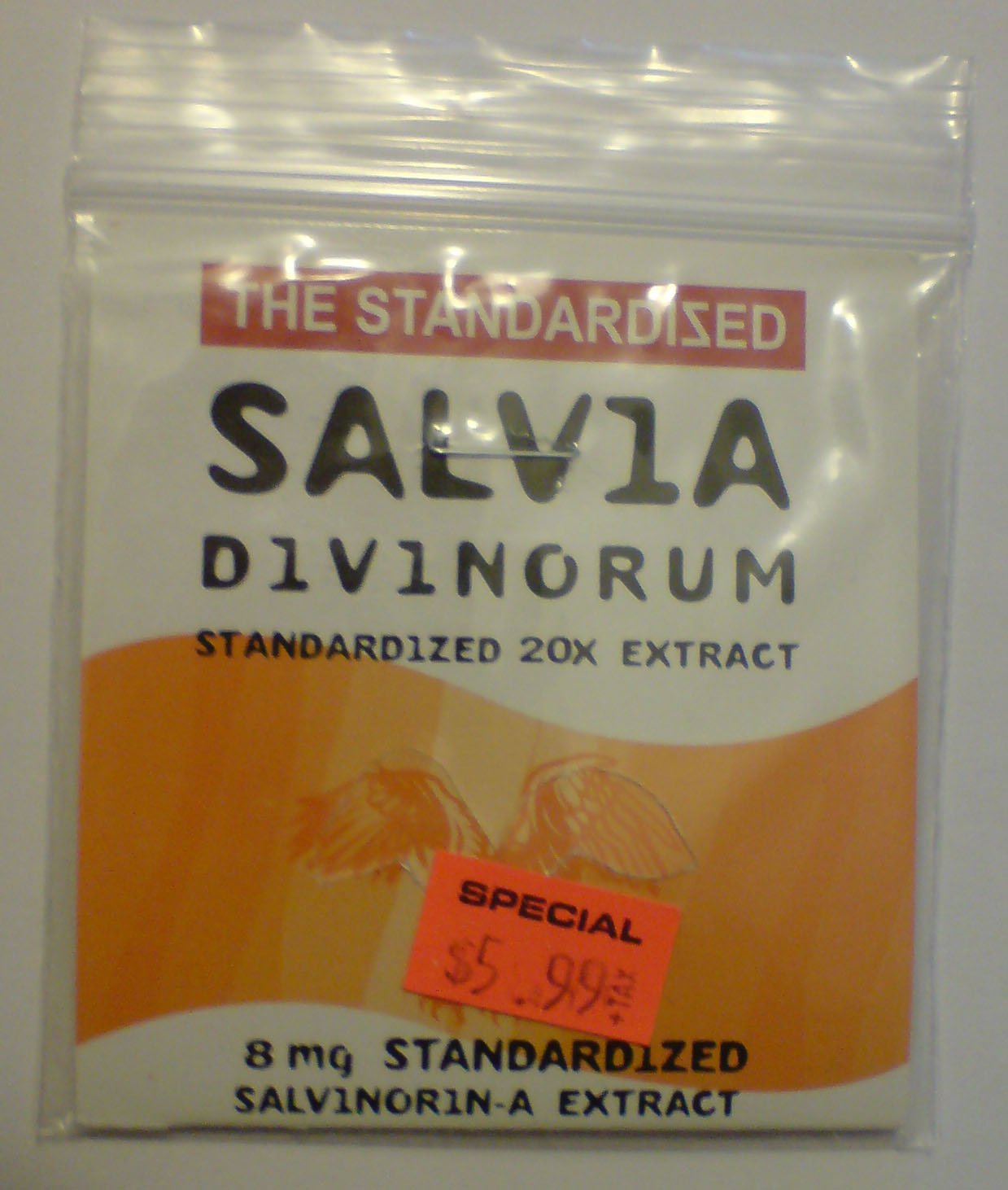
Salvia extract as it is commonly sold in stores where it is legal

The relatively recent emergence of Salvia divinorum in modern Western culture, in comparison to its long continuing traditions of Indigenous use, contrasts widely differing attitudes on the subject.

Opinions range from veneration of the plant as a spiritual sacrament or "a gift from the gods" to a "threat to society," to be banned as quickly as possible in order to "spare countless families the horror of losing a loved one to the relentless tentacles of drug abuse".

=== Media coverage ===
Interest in Salvia divinorum escalated in the news media in the late 2000s, particularly in the United States, where an increasing number of newspaper reports have been published and television news stories broadcast.

These stories generally raise alarms over salvia's legal status, for example comparing it to LSD, or describing it as "the new pot", with parental concerns being raised by particular focus on salvia's use by younger teens.

Story headlines may also include 'danger' keywords, such as "Dangerous Herb is Legal..." or "Deadly Dangers Of A Street Legal High".

Mainstream news coverage and journalistic opinion has widely been negative on the subject. In a local news report aired on ABC affiliate WJLA in Washington, DC on July 11, 2007, the anchors are seen to exchange expressions of incredulity when referring to a salvia story with the following introduction "Now, an exclusive I-Team investigation of a hallucinogenic drug that has begun to sweep the nation. What might amaze you is that right now the federal government is doing nothing to stop it."

In March 2008, a Texas news report aired with the story "A legal drug that teenagers are now using to get high could soon be banned here in San Antonio - all because of a Fox News 4 investigation," going on to say, "The drug is legal in Texas, at least for now. But a News 4 investigation could lead to a new ordinance to protect your kids."

Many salvia media stories headline with comparisons to LSD. However, while LSD and salvinorin A may have comparative potencies, in the sense that both can produce their effects at low dosages, they are otherwise quite different. The two substances are not chemically similar or related, as salvinorin A is found naturally in a single plant while LSD is chemically semisynthesized from lysergamides like ergotamine. They are ingested in different ways and produce different effects, which manifest themselves over different timescales. For example, the effects of salvia when smoked typically last for only a few minutes as compared to LSD, whose effects can persist for 8 to 12 hours.

=== Brett's law ===
A particular focus of many US media stories is the long-running coverage of the case of Brett Chidester, a 17-year-old Delaware student who committed suicide in January 2006 by carbon monoxide poisoning.

Reportedly, some months before this, Brett's mother Kathleen Chidester had learned about his salvia use and questioned him about it. Brett said that he had ceased his experimentation, but his parents did not believe that he was telling the truth. They have instead argued that salvia-induced depression was largely to blame for his death. Some of Brett's earlier writings about his salvia experiences have been used to suggest that it made him think "existence in general is pointless." Some media stories have referred to these earlier written experience reports as if they were part of Brett's suicide note. A law was soon passed in Delaware classifying the herb as a Schedule I controlled substance in that state. This legislation was nicknamed Brett's law (formally referred to as Senate bill 259).

Although the Chidester story has been given continued exposure by US media, there has not been anywhere else, either before or since this controversial incident, any other reported cases involving or alleging Salvia divinorum as a serious factor in suicide, overdose, accidental, or any other kind of death. Regarding this, San Francisco attorney Alex Coolman has commented, "It's remarkable that Chidester's parents, and only Chidester's parents, continue to be cited over and over again by the mainstream media in their coverage of the supposed 'controversy' over the risks of Salvia divinorum."

Kathleen Chidester has continued campaigning for "Schedule I"-like legislation beyond their home state of Delaware. For example, three years after Brett's death, in written testimony in support of Senator Richard Colburn's proposed Senate Bill to the Maryland State Legislature, saying, "My hope and goal is to have salvia regulated across the US. It's my son's legacy and I will not end my fight until this happens."

=== Usage shown on YouTube ===
In 2007, videos were shared on YouTube of alleged salvia users laughing uncontrollably, apparently unable to perform simple tasks or to communicate. In an interview published in the San Francisco Chronicle in June 2007, Daniel Siebert said that the videos "make salvia look like some horrible drug that makes people nuts and dangerous ..." and that it stops people from realizing "there are sensible ways to use something like this."

Waco Representative Charles Anderson (R), who is sponsoring one of several bills to ban salvia in Texas, (Note: In fact the video is one in a series of parodies featuring Erik J. Hoffstad, a production assistant in Los Angeles. In the film Hoffstad smokes salvia in a parked car (his friends reportedly making sure he did not have the real keys).) told colleagues at a legislative hearing about a video that depicts a salvia user behind the wheel of a car. "What we really worry about, is youngsters doing this and then getting in a vehicle or getting on a motorcycle or jumping in a pool somewhere."

Michigan Representative Michael Sak (D) submitted a bill which proposed Schedule I classification of Salvia divinorum and salvinorin A. He said that if people had questions about the deleterious effects of salvia, they should go on YouTube to watch the videos. A reporter questioned Sak as to whether he had ever seen a "Girls Gone Wild" video, and whether that would incite him to make alcohol illegal (Sak replied that he hadn't yet had a chance to review the material). (Note: The reporter noted that Sak had received more money from the Michigan Beer and Wine Wholesalers Association than anyone else in the House. According to the National Institute on Money in State Politics, the Michigan Beer and Wine Wholesalers Association was the highest contributor to Zak's 2006 political campaign.)

Nebraska Senator Vickie McDonald responded with "Anytime anything's on YouTube it's an issue," and "Legislators, parents, grandparents, we need to be on top of these things," McDonald proposed Schedule I listing Salvia divinorum as part of their Controlled Substances Act, under which possession of salvia would have been considered a Class IV felony with a penalty of up to five years and trafficking would have fallen under a Class III felony with up to a 20 year penalty.

In Massachusetts, YouTube videos were shown by a retired police officer to public health and judiciary committees as evidence in favor of outlawing it there.

The issue has been raised of whether the salvia videos are in breach of YouTube's own community guidelines, which ask users not to "cross the line" and post videos showing "bad stuff" like "drug abuse". The question is considered as particularly problematical as the videos may be something of an enforcement grey area.

== Legal status ==
Many countries control Salvia divinorum in some manner. As of 2015, it is illegal in Australia, Belgium, parts of Canada, Croatia, Czech Republic, Denmark, Germany, Hong Kong, Italy, Japan, Latvia, Lithuania, Poland, Portugal, Republic of Ireland, Romania, South Korea, Sweden, and Switzerland. It is legal to possess and grow in Chile, France and Spain, but not to sell. In Russia, it is legal to possess, but not grow or sell. Estonia, Finland, Iceland, and Norway treat it as a medicinal herb that requires a prescription.

The prohibitive degree of Salvia divinorum legislation varies widely from country to country. Australia has imposed its strictest 'schedule 9' (US Schedule I equivalent), and Italy has also placed salvia in its 'Table I' of controlled substances (also US Schedule I equivalent). In Spain, there are controls focusing only on the commercial trade of Salvia divinorum, personal cultivation (i.e. for non-commercial use) is not targeted.

Legislation may prove difficult to enforce. The plant has a nondescript appearance; unlike many other drug plants, the leaves are non-descript, and without a detectable odour. Salvia divinorum can be grown as an ordinary houseplant without the need of special equipment such as hydroponics or high-power lights.

=== United Kingdom ===
In the United Kingdom, following a local newspaper story in October 2005, a parliamentary Early Day Motion was raised calling for Salvia divinorum to be banned there. However, it only received 11 signatures. A second motion raised in October 2008 attracted 18 signatures, and it was reported that Mann had also written to Jacqui Smith, then Home Secretary. The Advisory Council on the Misuse of Drugs, the independent body that advises UK government on drugs, was asked to investigate further.

On the 28 January 2016, the Psychoactive Substances Act 2016 was passed. The act came into force on 26 May 2016, across the entire United Kingdom, making S. divinorum illegal to possess with intent to supply, possess on custodial premises, import for human consumption, or produce for human consumption. The two sponsors for the bill were Conservative House of Lords member Michael Bates and Conservative MP Theresa May.

=== Australia ===
Salvia divinorum is considered a Schedule 9 prohibited substance in Australia under the Poisons Standard. Under the Standard, schedule 9 prohibited substances are defined as "Substances which may be abused or misused, the manufacture, possession, supply or use of which should be prohibited by law except when required for medical or scientific research, or for analytical, teaching or training purposes with approval of Commonwealth and/or State or Territory Health Authorities."

=== United States ===
National legislation for amendment of the Controlled Substances Act to place salvinorin A and Salvia divinorum in Schedule I at the federal level in the United States was proposed in 2002 by Representative Joe Baca (D- California). Those opposed to bill HR 5607 include Daniel Siebert, who sent a letter to Congress arguing against the proposed legislation, and the Center for Cognitive Liberty and Ethics (CCLE), who sent key members of the US Congress a report on Salvia divinorum and its active principle, along with letters from an array of scientists who expressed concern that scheduling Salvia divinorum would negatively impact important research on the plant. The bill did not pass.

Although salvia is not regulated under the Controlled Substances Act, as of 2009, it had been made illegal in 13 states. Delaware banned it after salvia use was reported to have played a role in the suicide of a teenager. Alabama, Delaware, Illinois, Louisiana, Michigan, Missouri, Ohio, Texas, and other states have passed their own laws. Several other states have proposed legislation against salvia, including Alaska, California, Florida, Iowa, Maryland, New Jersey, New York, Oregon, and Pennsylvania. Many of these proposals have not made it into law, with motions having failed, stalled or otherwise died, for example at committee review stages.

Where individual state legislation does exist, it varies from state to state in its prohibitive degree.

Legal consequences may also exist even in states without bans on salvia in particular. Christian Firoz, a Nebraska store owner, was charged for selling salvia, but not under the auspices of any specific law against Salvia divinorum. Firoz was instead charged under a general Nebraskan statute which makes it illegal to sell a product to induce an intoxicated condition. Firoz was found not guilty.. See also the legal status of salvia in North Dakota and Nebraska.

Salvia divinorum has been banned by various branches of the U.S. military and some military bases.

==== Internet sale ====
Some internet vendors will not sell live salvia cuttings, leaf, or leaf products to states where its use is restricted or prohibited. Per their drugs and drug paraphernelia policy, eBay does not permit sale of Salvia divinorum or derived products (despite legality in most areas).

=== Opinions and arguments ===
Concerns expressed by some politicians on the subject of salvia reflect those of the media, with comparisons to LSD and particular focus on "protecting our children" being echoed; and with legislative proposals following soon after news stories breaking.

Some arguments against salvia have been of a preventative nature, "We need to stop this before it gets to be a huge problem not after it gets to be a huge problem," or of an imitative nature, "The Australians have clearly found a problem with it. There's obviously a risk in people taking it." Concerns about driving while under the influence of salvia have also been expressed.

Opponents of more prohibitive measures against salvia argue that such reactions are largely due to an inherent prejudice and a particular cultural bias rather than any actual balance of evidence, pointing out inconsistencies in attitudes toward other more toxic and addictive drugs such as alcohol and nicotine. (Note: According to the National Institute on Money in State Politics, which indicates the major sources of campaign contributions for U.S. politicians, a large part of contributions to U.S. Congressional campaigns comes from alcohol and tobacco industries. For example, Oregon Representative John Lim"s third largest individual campaign sponsor in 2006 was the Oregon Beer & Wine Distributors Association Lim(R) argued for Schedule I classification of Salvia in Oregon. Former Delaware Senator Karen Peterson's second largest group campaign donations in 2006 came from "Beer, Wine & Liquor" industries. Peterson(D) introduced Schedule I classification of Salvia divinorum in Delaware. Senator Tim Burchett(R) sponsored Salvia legislation in Tennessee. In 2006, his second largest individual campaign donation came from the Tennessee Malt Beverage Association. In the same period alcohol and tobacco related contributions amounted to the fourth largest industry contributions for Utah Representative Paul Ray(R). Representative Ray submitted a bill calling for Schedule I classification of Salvia in that state. Alcohol related contributions also featured highly for Illinois Representative Dennis Reboletti(R) "Beer, Wine & Liquor" was his ninth highest industry contributor in 2006 and 2008. Representative Reboletti sponsored a bill for Schedule I classification of Salvia divinorum in Illinois.) (Note: The worldwide number of alcohol-related deaths is calculated at over 2,000 people per day, in the US the number is over 300 deaths per day.) While not objecting to some form of legal control, in particular with regard to the sale to minors or sale of enhanced high-strength extracts, most salvia proponents otherwise argue against stricter legislation.

Those advocating consideration of Salvia divinorum's potential for beneficial use in a modern context argue that more could be learned from Mazatec culture, where salvia is not really associated with notions of drug taking at all and it is rather considered as a spiritual sacrament. In light of this it is argued that Salvia divinorum could be better understood more positively as an entheogen rather than pejoratively as a hallucinogen. (Note: Other entheogenic plants with continuing traditions principally of spiritual use include peyote (and other psychoactive cacti), iboga, virola, ayahuasca, and various types of psychoactive fungi. Current U.S. Federal law allows two of these to be used in a spiritual context. The Native American Church is permitted use of peyote; the União do Vegetal (or UDV) is permitted use of ayahuasca. Although not consistently granted (varying from state to state), the principal grounds for such concessions are constitutional, with further grounds following from the Religious Freedom Restoration Act.)

==== Public opinion ====
Despite its growing notoriety in some circles, media stories generally suggest that the public at large are still mostly unaware of salvia, with the majority perhaps having never even heard of it.

Although published responses may not necessarily be representative of public opinion as a whole, some news agencies generally support reader and viewer feedback in connection with their stories.

== See also ==
- κ-Opioid receptor agonist
