= Dennis Reboletti =

American politician

Addison Township
- In office May 2017 – May 2025
- Preceded by: Kathryn Cermak-Durante

Member of the Illinois House of Representatives from the 45th district 46th District (2007-2013)
- In office January 2007 – January 2015
- Preceded by: Lee A. Daniels
- Succeeded by: Christine Winger

Personal details
- Born: October 5, 1968 (age 57)
- Party: Republican
- Education: Eastern Illinois University (BA); Valparaiso University (JD)
- Profession: Attorney

Dennis Reboletti is a former Republican member of the Illinois House of Representatives, representing the 46th district since 2007. He was elected State Representative on November 7, 2006, defeating Democratic candidate Joe Vosicky.

Reboletti is a former Will county Assistant State's Attorney and former Addison Township Trustee. He has a B.A. in political science from Eastern Illinois University, and a J.D. from Valparaiso University School of Law. Reboletti previously ran for Illinois Senate in the 23rd district in 2004, but lost in the Republican primary to Carole Pankau. He is the former Addison Township Supervisor. Reboletti ran for another term as Supervisor, but lost in April 2025.

== Reboletti's first House bill ==
On January 26, 2007. freshman State Representative Dennis Reboletti filed House Bill HB457 which proposed Schedule I classification for the psychoactive herb Salvia divinorum, including :"the seeds thereof, any extract from any part of that plant, and every compound, [...] derivative, mixture, or preparation of that plant".

The bill does not mention the active chemical constituent salvinorin A. Salvia expert Daniel Siebert criticised this wording as being: "absurdly broad in scope, for it implies that any substance extracted from Salvia divinorum (water, chlorophyll, whatever) would be treated as a Schedule I controlled substance under the proposed law."

March 2007 news of the bill's passage on Reboletti's website alleged that Salvia is a

powerful psychoactive plant which in appearance looks like marijuana but has the psychoactive properties of LSD.

Reboletti said,

It’s important that we in the legislature are proactive in protecting our children from highly addictive substances

and

For a drug to be classified as a Schedule 1 substance signifies that it’s a highly dangerous and potentially lethal drug for its user. Hopefully, the passage of my bill will bring attention to "Magic Mint" and help law enforcement combat the future rise of this drug.

Salvia divinorum article references and other sources indicate however that Salvia does not look like marijuana. Its psychoactive properties are not like those of LSD, and that Salvia divinorum is not generally understood to be either addictive or toxic.

By May 22, 2007, HB0457 had received support from all 173 members in both bodies of the democratic majority Illinois General Assembly. It was sent to the governor of Illinois, Rod Blagojevich (D), on June 20, 2007, and was signed into law on Friday August 17, 2007. The law came into effect on January 1, 2008.

In a statement given prior to the bill coming into effect Reboletti said,

I've seen the argument to legalize marijuana. It is a gateway drug, like salvia could be a gateway drug,

and

We decided to move forward rather than waiting for someone to be killed because of it.

A critical editorial was published by the Chicago Sun-Times on the eve of Reboletti's law coming into effect. It commented -

Legislators must have been on something to zero in on this obscure organic substance ... The last time we checked, Illinois was not besieged by a salvia epidemic. We don't see the urgency in criminalizing a substance with no clear track record of causing people to act in a dangerous manner or hurt other people ... considering how overcrowded our prisons are with dangerous criminals, trolling around for more nonviolent drug offenders to punish is counterintuitive... Regulating use of, rather than banning salvia, would have been a more sober approach.

Opponents of extremely prohibitive Salvia restrictions argue that such reactions are largely due to an inherent prejudice and a particular cultural bias rather than any actual balance of evidence, pointing out inconsistencies in attitudes toward other more toxic and addictive drugs such as alcohol and nicotine. While not objecting to some form of regulatory legal control, in particular with regard to the sale to minors or sale of enhanced high-strength extracts, most Salvia proponents otherwise argue against stricter legislation. Alcohol related financial contributions featured highly for Representative Dennis Reboletti's 2006 political campaign. According to the National Institute on Money in State Politics, 'Beer, Wine & Liquor' was his seventh highest industry contributor.

== See also ==
- Legal status of Salvia divinorum

== Notes ==
1. The worldwide number of alcohol-related deaths is calculated at over 2,000 people per day, in the US the number is over 300 deaths per day.
2. Those advocating consideration of Salvia divinorum's potential for beneficial use in a modern context argue that more could be learned from Mazatec culture, where Salvia is not really associated with notions of drug taking at all and it is rather considered as a spiritual sacrament. In light of this it is argued that Salvia divinorum could be better understood more positively as an entheogen rather than pejoratively as a hallucinogen.
