= Sierra Mazateca =

Part of the Sierra Madre de Oaxaca mountain range in Oaxaca, Mexico

Coordinates: 18.3800°N 99.1000°W

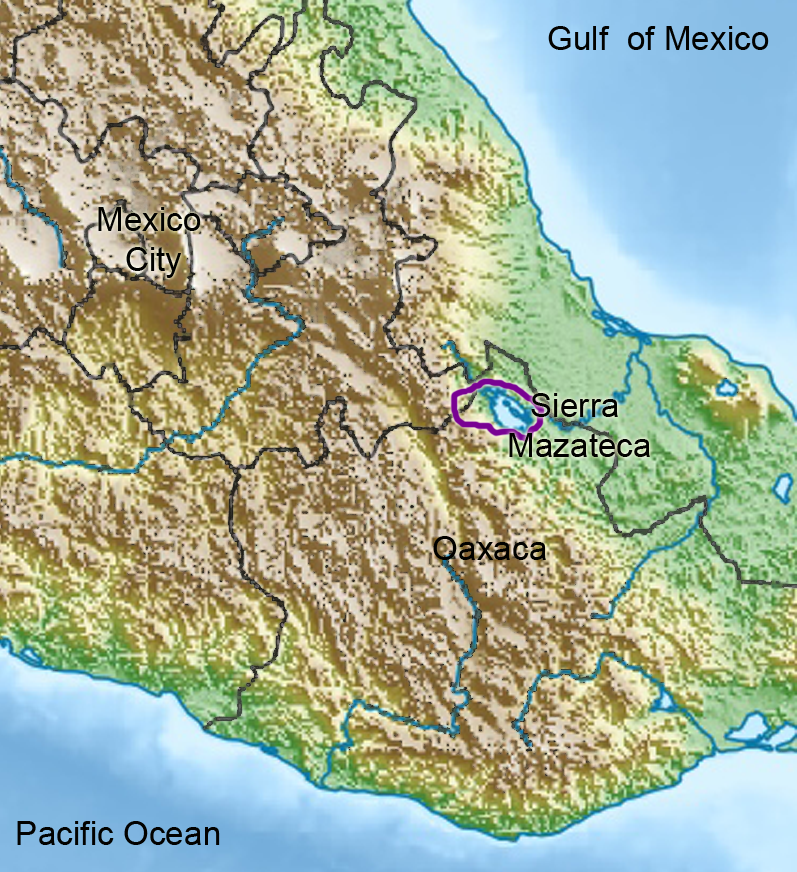
Location in Mexico

The Sierra Mazateca is a mountainous area, part of the Sierra Madre de Oaxaca mountain range, located in the northern part of the state of Oaxaca in Southern Mexico. It is named after the Mazatec people, who are indigenous to the area.

== Geography ==
Its western part is within the district of Teotitlan del Camino in the Cañada Region; and its eastern part is within the district of Tuxtepec, in the Papaloapan Region.

The main towns of the region are Huautla de Jimenez, Eloxochitlán de Flores Magón and Jalapa de Díaz.

In 1954 the eastern part of the Sierra Mazateca region was submerged by the construction of the Miguel Alemán Dam, now under Miguel Alemán Lake reservoir.

== See also ==
- María Sabina, a Mazatec shaman and poet
- Sierra Madre de Oaxaca topics
