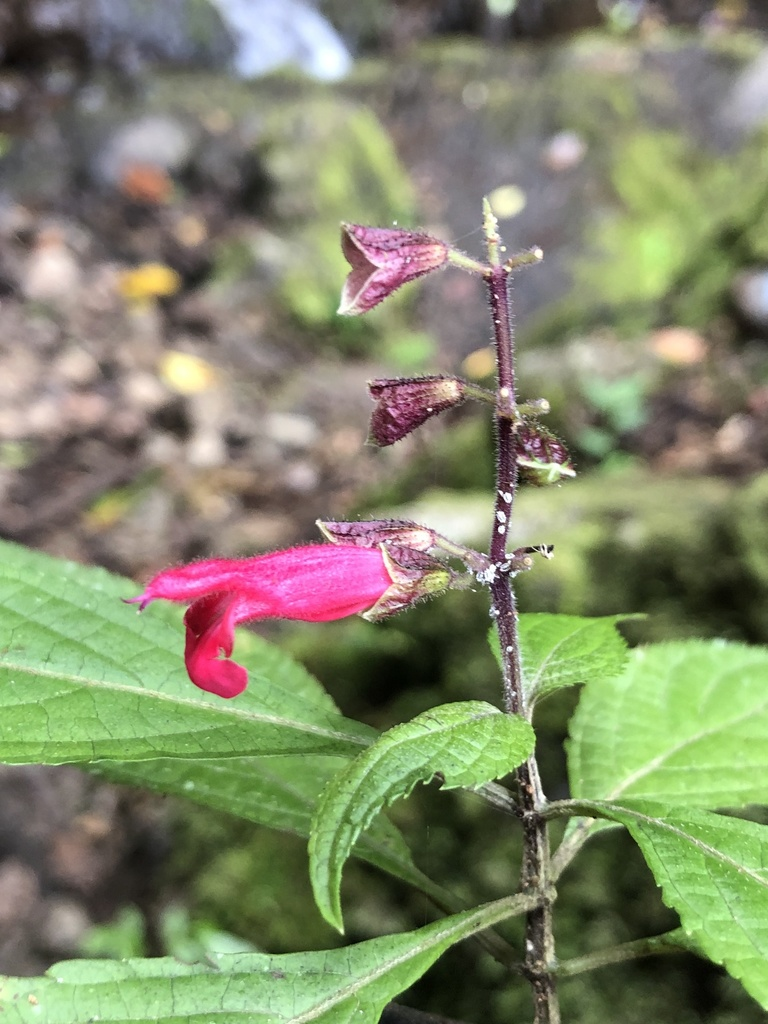

Scientific classification
- Kingdom: Plantae
- Clade: Tracheophytes
- Clade: Angiosperms
- Clade: Eudicots
- Clade: Asterids
- Order: Lamiales
- Family: Lamiaceae
- Genus: Salvia
- Species: S. venulosa

Binomial name
- Salvia venulosa Epling

= Salvia venulosa =

Species of flowering plant

Salvia venulosa is a perennial plant that is native to a very small region of the Western Cordillera in Colombia. It grows at 1,500 to 2,000 m (4,900 to 6,600 ft) elevation in deeply shaded wooded gullies. S. venulosa grows less than 1 metre (3.3 ft) tall, with narrow ovate leaves that are 6 to 9 cm (2.4 to 3.5 in) long and 3 centimetres (1.2 in) wide, and violet on the underside. The flower is an unusual wine-red color.

A 2010 phylogenetic study of Salvia divinorum and 52 other Salvia species in the subgenus Calosphace suggest that S. venulosa is the closest known relative of S. divinorum. Relatively few species (out of the 600 species of Salvia occurring in Mexico and South America) were included in that study. And it is likely that another yet-to-be identified Salvia is actually more closely related to S. divinorum. There is no evidence whatsoever that S. venulosa has any uncommon alkaloids.
