= Mazatec =

Indigenous People of Mexico

Mazatec Ha Shuta Enima
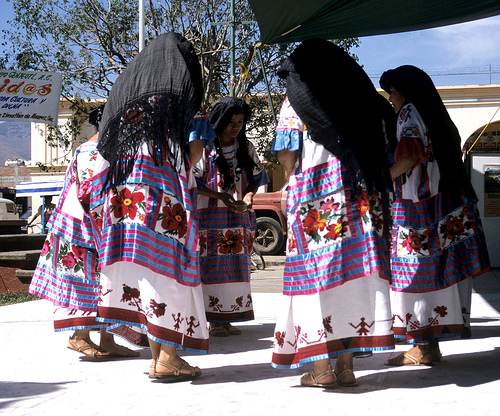
- Mazatec girls performing a dance in Huautla de Jimenez

Total population
- ~305,836

Regions with significant populations
- Mexico (Oaxaca)

Languages
- Mazatec, Spanish

Religion
- Roman Catholic, and Traditional religion

Related ethnic groups
- Popolocas

The Mazatec are an Indigenous people of Mexico who inhabit the Sierra Mazateca in the state of Oaxaca and some communities in the adjacent states of Puebla and Veracruz.

Some researchers have theorized that the Mazatec, along with Popoloca speakers, once inhabited the lowlands of the Papaloapan basin, but were driven into the adjacent highlands by the expansion of Nahuas.

== Language family ==
The Mazatecan languages are part of the Popolocan family which, in turn, is part of the Otomanguean language family.

== Traditional religious rituals ==
Mazatec tradition includes the cultivation of entheogens for spiritual and ritualistic use. Plants and fungi used for this purpose include psilocybin mushrooms, psychoactive morning glory seeds (from species such as Ipomoea tricolor and Ipomoea corymbosa), and Salvia divinorum. This latter plant is known to Mazatec shamans as ska María Pastora, the name containing a reference to the Virgin Mary.

== Notable Mazatecs ==
- María Sabina
- Julieta Casimiro

== See also ==
- Indigenous peoples in Mexico
- Mixtec
