= Brenda Heller =

American politician (born 1963)

Member of the North Dakota House of Representatives from the 33rd district
- In office December 1, 2006 – December 1, 2014
- Preceded by: Pat Galvin
- Succeeded by: Jay Seibel

Personal details
- Born: August 19, 1963 (age 62)
- Party: Republican
- Education: North Dakota State University (BS)

Brenda Heller (born August 19, 1963) is an American politician who served in the North Dakota House of Representatives from the 33rd district from 2006 to 2014.
