= Mazatec shamanism =

Shaman group in the Americas

The Mazatec shamans are known for their ritual use of psilocybin mushrooms, psychoactive morning glory seeds, and Salvia divinorum. María Sabina was one of the best known of the Mazatec Shamans. Her healing psilocybin mushroom ceremonies, called veladas, contributed to the popularization of Indigenous Mexican ritual use of entheogenic mushrooms among westerners.

In their rituals, Mazatec shamans use fresh Salvia divinorum leaves. Ritual use traditionally involves being in a quiet place after ingestion of the leaf—the Mazatec shamans say that "La Maria (S. divinorum) speaks with a quiet voice."

There is little information concerning the Mazatec people generally before the arrival of the Spanish and less concerning their spiritual practices.

Several researchers have commented on the difficulty in obtaining information, as the Mazatec shamans tend to be secretive and protective of their practices.

== Background ==
Mazatec shamanism has deep roots in the spiritual traditions of pre-Hispanic Mesoamerica. Practices such as divination with corn kernels have been documented in 16th-century codices and persist among contemporary Indigenous groups. Early 20th-century ethnographers such as Blas Pablo Reko, Jean Bassett Johnson, and Richard Evans Schultes documented the ritual use of Psilocybe mushrooms by the Mazatec, but international interest increased dramatically after R. Gordon Wasson's widely publicized 1955 visit to Huautla de Jiménez and his encounter with María Sabina.

== Sacred mushrooms and ritual practice ==
At the center of Mazatec healing practices is the ritual ingestion of Psilocybe mushrooms, known locally as ndi xijtho ("the little ones that sprout") or “holy children.” These mushrooms are not merely seen as substances, but as conscious entities capable of communicating wisdom and healing. Their use occurs during nocturnal ceremonies known as veladas, which involve prayer, chanting, incense, and symbolic offerings.

Mazatec veladas ceremonies are highly structured nighttime rituals guided by a shaman or chjota chijne. These rituals are often conducted in dark, quiet environments, often within the shaman’s home or a designated ceremonial space. The use of candles, incense, flowers, and Catholic imagery is a direct parallel to the "Set, Setting, and Dose" concept in modern psychedelic medicine.

When mushrooms are not in season, Mazatec shamans may instead use other visionary plants such as Salvia divinorum (Ska Pastora), or seeds from Rivea corymbosa and Ipomoea violacea, commonly called “Seeds of the Virgin.” Each plant is selected based on the shaman’s specialization, the season, and the patient’s needs. The ritual use of these plants often facilitates an ecstatic trance through which the shaman may diagnose illness, find lost objects or souls, and seek spiritual guidance. Participants in velada ceremonies fast and abstain from sexual activity prior to the ceremony. The shaman leads the ritual through chanting and invocation, using poetic and metaphorical language referred to as the "language of the saints." These chants are considered central to the healing process and are believed to guide both the participants and the spiritual forces involved.

== Training and selection ==
Becoming a chjota chijne (shaman) involves a gradual initiation process that often begins with visionary experiences or spiritual callings. The path varies but often involves selection by divine beings through dreams, an unexplained illness, or spiritual inheritance. Some are born into it; others are chosen by existing shamans or by sacred forces such as the mushrooms themselves. Initiates undergo rigorous training that includes mastery of ritual speech, knowledge of medicinal plants, and experience navigating altered states of consciousness. Successful shamans are known for their ability to enter and return from trance states with insight, and to direct the healing process effectively for others. The shaman's role implies a lifelong commitment to serving both the community and the divine.

== Syncretism and spiritual landscape ==
Mazatec spirituality is deeply syncretic, blending Catholic figures like the Virgin Mary, Saint Peter, and Saint Martin Caballero with Indigenous deities such as Chicón-Nindo, Lord of the Hills. During veladas, shamans often prepare a ritual "table" or altar that represents sacred geography and includes candles, copal incense, cocoa, alcohol, flowers, and religious icons.

The ritual language used during trance—rich in metaphor and symbolic imagery—is a fundamental tool for communication with sacred entities. As one Mazatec shaman described, “Time is a giant snake… that binds past, present, and future.” The mushrooms are believed to speak through the shaman’s voice, guiding the ceremony and the healing process.

== Tourism, authenticity, and cultural tensions ==
Since the 1950s, when the rituals of María Sabina were publicized by R. Gordon Wasson, Mazatec mushroom ceremonies have drawn increasing interest from outside visitors. The growing interest in psychedelic experiences has led to a rise in tourism to the Mazatec region, especially in Huautla de Jiménez. While some locals have embraced the economic benefits, others criticize the commodification of sacred traditions expressing concerns over dilution and commodification of their spiritual traditions. Accusations of inauthenticity and exploitation have been reported both by community members and by anthropologists.

María Sabina herself expressed concern about outsiders seeking mushroom ceremonies for entertainment rather than healing. Scholars and activists have also noted that media portrayals and foreign interest often reduce complex spiritual practices to folkloric curiosities. Though she was central to global awareness of Mazatec practices, she lamented the loss of sacredness as mushroom rituals became tourist attractions.

=== Music and auditory elements in veladas ===
Sound plays a central role in Mazatec veladas ceremonies. The shaman employs chants, prayers and poetic language to guide participants often referred to as the "language of the saints". These vocalizations are believed to facilitate communication with sacred entities and to direct the healing process.

The chants are characterized by metaphorical and symbolic language. They often incorporate elements of the natural world and spirits. One example is time being described as a "giant snake" that binds past, present, and future, illustrating the shaman's perception of temporal fluidity during the ceremony.

In addition to vocalizations, the ceremonial environment of a velada may include the use of instruments such as rattles or drums, as well as ambient sounds like the burning of incense. These elements contribute to the sensory experience and can help induce brain entrainment or trance states. This is with the goal of facilitating spiritual encounters.

The auditory part of veladas are not merely ceremonial, they are integral to the therapeutic and spiritual objectives of the ritual. By deliberately using sound, the shaman creates a sonic landscape that supports the participant's journey, connecting them with the divine, and promoting healing.

== Notable figures ==
The most internationally known Mazatec shaman is María Sabina (1894–1985), who lived in Huautla de Jiménez in the Sierra Mazateca. Her veladas with psilocybin mushrooms attracted widespread attention and influenced both scientific and countercultural interest in entheogens. Though she became a symbol of Indigenous wisdom, her legacy also reflects the complexities of intercultural exchange, exploitation, and cultural resilience.
