= Daniel Siebert (ethnobotanist) =

American ethnobotanist

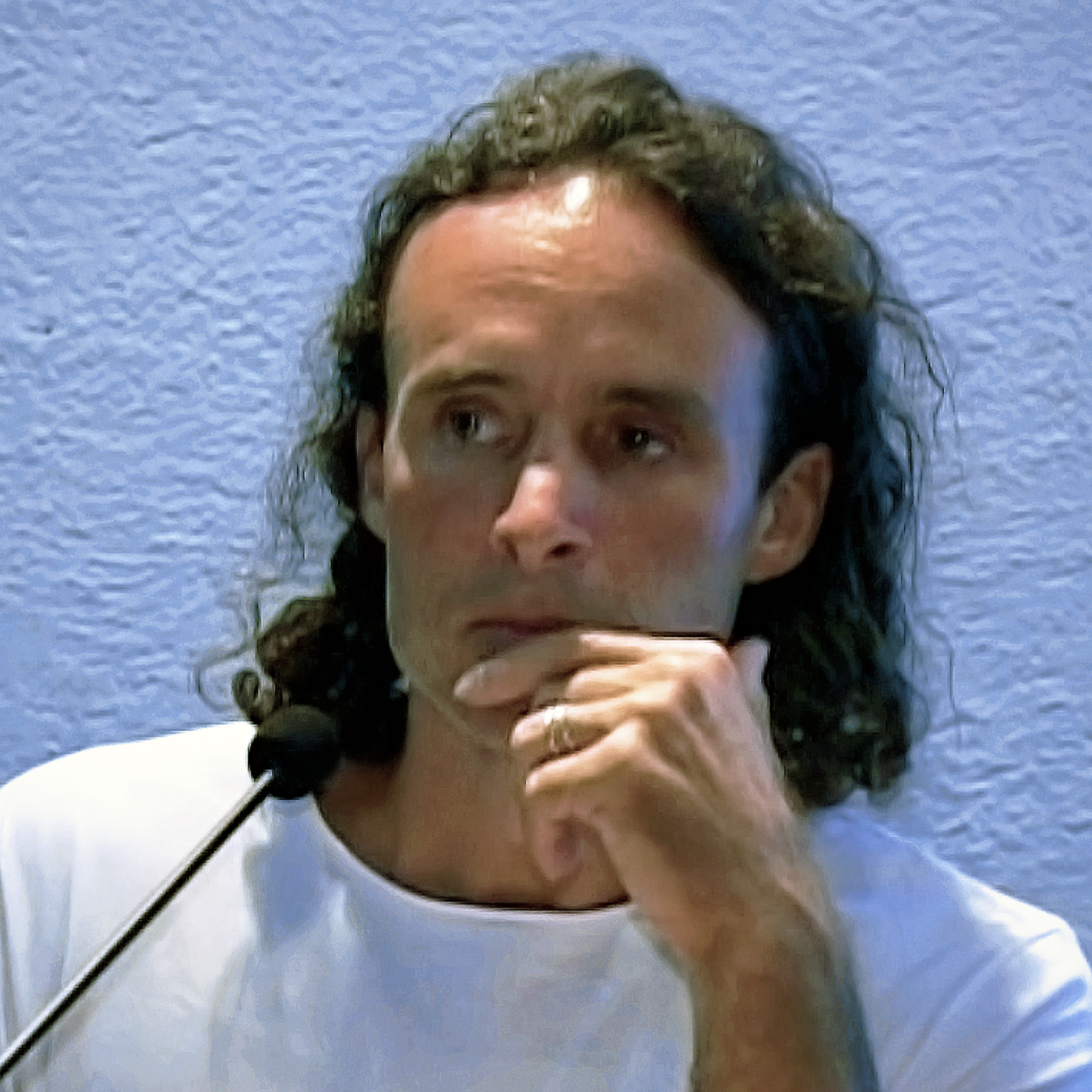
- Daniel Siebert at the 2004 Mind States Oaxaca conference.
- Born: 1963
- Died: 2024 (aged 60–61)
- Known for: Work with Salvia divinorum and salvinorin A

Daniel J. Siebert (1963–2024) was an ethnobotanist, pharmacognosist, and author who lived in Southern California.

Siebert studied Salvia divinorum for over twenty years. Based on self-experiments with friends in 1993, he was the first person to unequivocally identify salvinorin A as the active psychoactive compound in Salvia divinorum. In 1998, Siebert appeared in the documentary Sacred Weeds shown in the United Kingdom. He was interviewed about Salvia divinorum on National Public Radio, Fox News, CNN, Telemundo and his comments have appeared in the Los Angeles Times, USA Today, and The New York Times.

In 2002, Siebert wrote a letter to the United States Congress in which he objected to bill H.R. 5607 introduced by Rep. Joe Baca (D-California) which sought to place Salvia divinorum in Schedule I of the Controlled Substances Act.

Siebert died in 2024 from alcoholism and heart issues including a heart attack.
