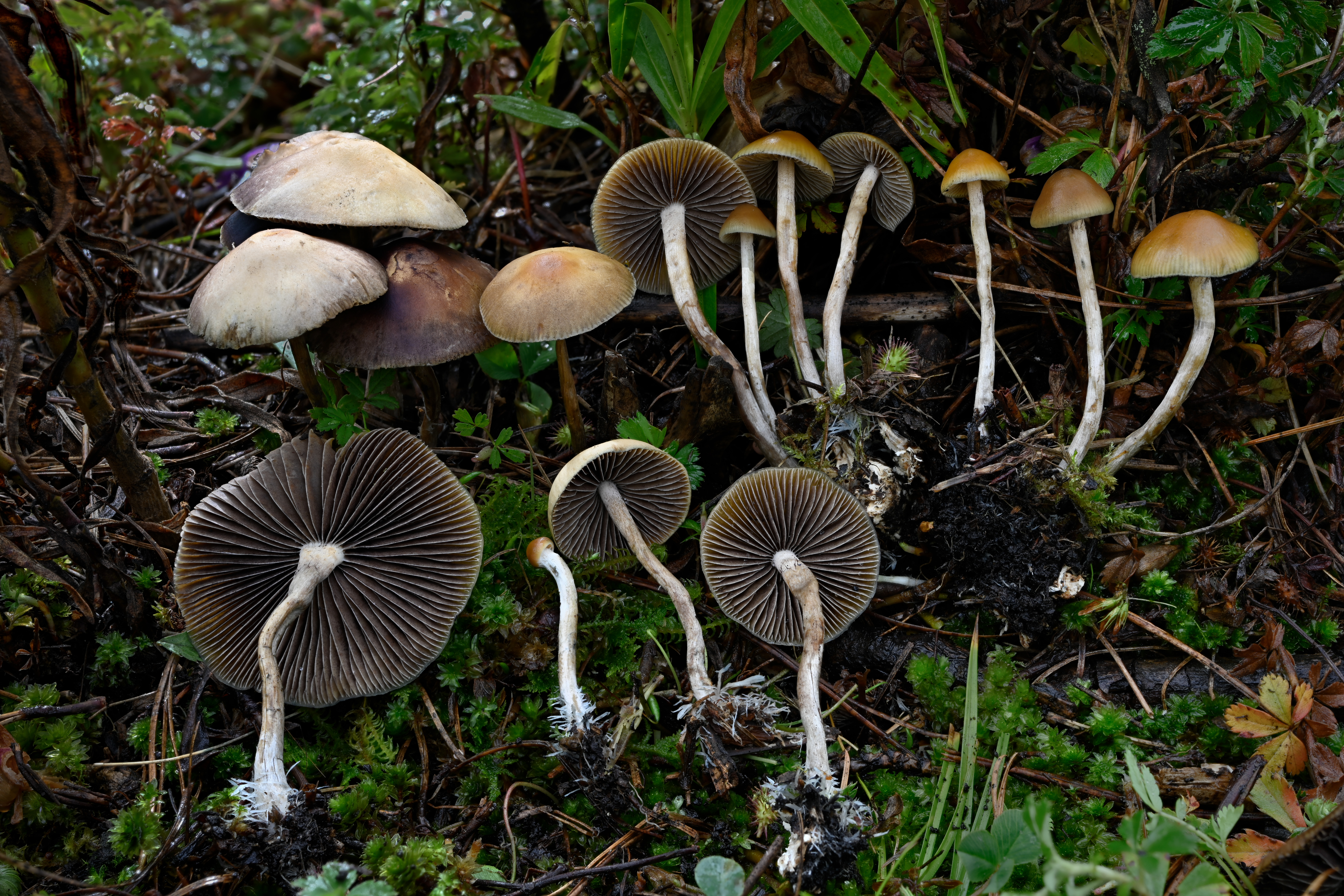
- In Nevado de Toluca, Mexico

Scientific classification
- Kingdom: Fungi
- Division: Basidiomycota
- Class: Agaricomycetes
- Order: Agaricales
- Family: Hymenogastraceae
- Genus: Psilocybe
- Species: P. aztecorum

Binomial name
- Psilocybe aztecorum R.Heim (1957)

Synonyms
- P. mexicana var. longispora Heim (1956); P. quebecensis Ola'h & R. Heim (1967)

= Psilocybe aztecorum =

Species of fungus

Psilocybe aztecorum
- Mycological characteristics
- Gills on hymenium
- Cap is convex or campanulate
- Hymenium is adnate or adnexed
- Stipe is bare
- Spore print is purple
- Ecology is saprotrophic
- Edibility is psychoactive

Psilocybe aztecorum is a species of psilocybin mushroom in the family Hymenogastraceae. Known only from central Mexico, the fungus grows on decomposing woody debris and is found in mountainous areas at elevations of 2,000 to 4,000 m (6,600 to 13,100 ft), typically in meadows or open, grassy conifer forests. The mushrooms have convex to bell-shaped caps 1.5–2 cm (0.6–0.8 in) in diameter, atop slender cylindrical stems that are up to 7.5 cm (3.0 in) long. The color of the caps changes with variations in hydration, ranging from dark chestnut brown to straw yellow or whitish when dry. The base of the stem is densely covered with conspicuous white rhizomorphs, a characteristic uncommon amongst Psilocybe species.

The species was first reported by French mycologist Roger Heim in 1956 as a variety of Psilocybe mexicana before he officially described it under its current name a year later. Named for its association with the Nahua people also called Aztecs, P. aztecorum may have been one of the sacred mushroom species, or teonanácatl (A Nahuatl word translated variously as "sacred mushroom" or "flesh of the gods"), reported in the codices of 16th-century Spanish chronicler Bernardino de Sahagún. The mushrooms are still used for spiritual ceremonies by Nahua people in the Popocatépetl region, although this traditional usage is waning. The variety P. aztecorum var. bonetii has smaller spores than the main variety, and is found at lower elevations with Montezuma pine (Pinus montezumae) and sacred fir (Abies religiosa). P. aztecorum may be distinguished from similar temperate species such as P. baeocystis and P. quebecensis by their ranges, and by differences in the morphology of microscopic structures like cystidia.

== Taxonomy and nomenclature ==
The species was first mentioned by French mycologist Roger Heim in 1956 based on material collected by American ethnomycologist R. Gordon Wasson in Paso de Cortés, on the slopes of Popocatépetl mountain in Mexico. Heim originally named the species as a variety of Psilocybe mexicana; limited to dried mushroom material for analysis, he only described the spores, which he explained were "relatively longer and narrower than that of Psilocybe mexicana". A year later, Heim renamed the fungus Psilocybe aztecorum and officially described it, in addition to several other Mexican Psilocybe taxa. Some of these mushrooms, including P. aztecorum, were illustrated in the popular American weekly magazine Life ("Seeking the Magic Mushroom"), in which Wasson recounted the psychedelic visions that he experienced during the divinatory rituals of the Mazatec people, thereby introducing psilocybin mushrooms to Western popular culture.

In 1978, Mexican mycologist and Psilocybe specialist Gastón Guzmán emended the description of P. aztecorum to include the color variation of the cap resulting from its strongly hygrophanous nature, the mycenoid form, the rhizoids at the base of the stem, the lignicolous habitat, and the size of the spores—all features that he thought were either confused, or not sufficiently detailed, in Heim's original description. In the same publication, Guzmán also characterized the variety P. aztecorum var. bonetii, distinguished from the main variety by its smaller spores. He had originally described this variant as a separate species, Psilocybe bonetii, in 1970. Further, Guzmán later published Psilocybe natarajanii, originally described by him from Tamil Nadu in southern India, as a synonym of P. aztecorum var. bonetii; this putative synonymy, however, is confirmed by neither MycoBank nor Index Fungorum. Guzmán called the main variety P. aztecorum var. aztecorum; for this reason, the species authority is often cited as "P. aztecorum var. aztecorum R. Heim emend. Guzmán".

Psilocybe aztecorum is the type species of Guzmán's section Aztecorum, a polyphyletic group of bluing (i.e., psilocybin-containing) Psilocybe mushrooms characterized by having a strongly hygrophanous cap that dries to brown or brownish white when dry; spores that appear asymmetrical when seen in side view; and pleurocystidia that, when present, are hyaline (translucent). Other species classified in section Aztecorum are P. baeocystis and P. quebecensis.

The specific epithet aztecorum refers to the Aztec peoples of central Mexico, who used this mushroom in traditional ceremonies long before the Spanish came to America. The variety P. aztecorum var. bonneti is named after Dr. Federico Bonet (died 1980), emeritus professor of the Escuela Nacional de Ciencias Biológicas, who assisted Guzmán with his doctoral studies. The popular names of P. aztecorum are niños or niñitos (children or little children), or in the Nahuatl language apipiltzin which means niños del agua ("children of the water"), alluding to their habitat along ravines.

== Description ==
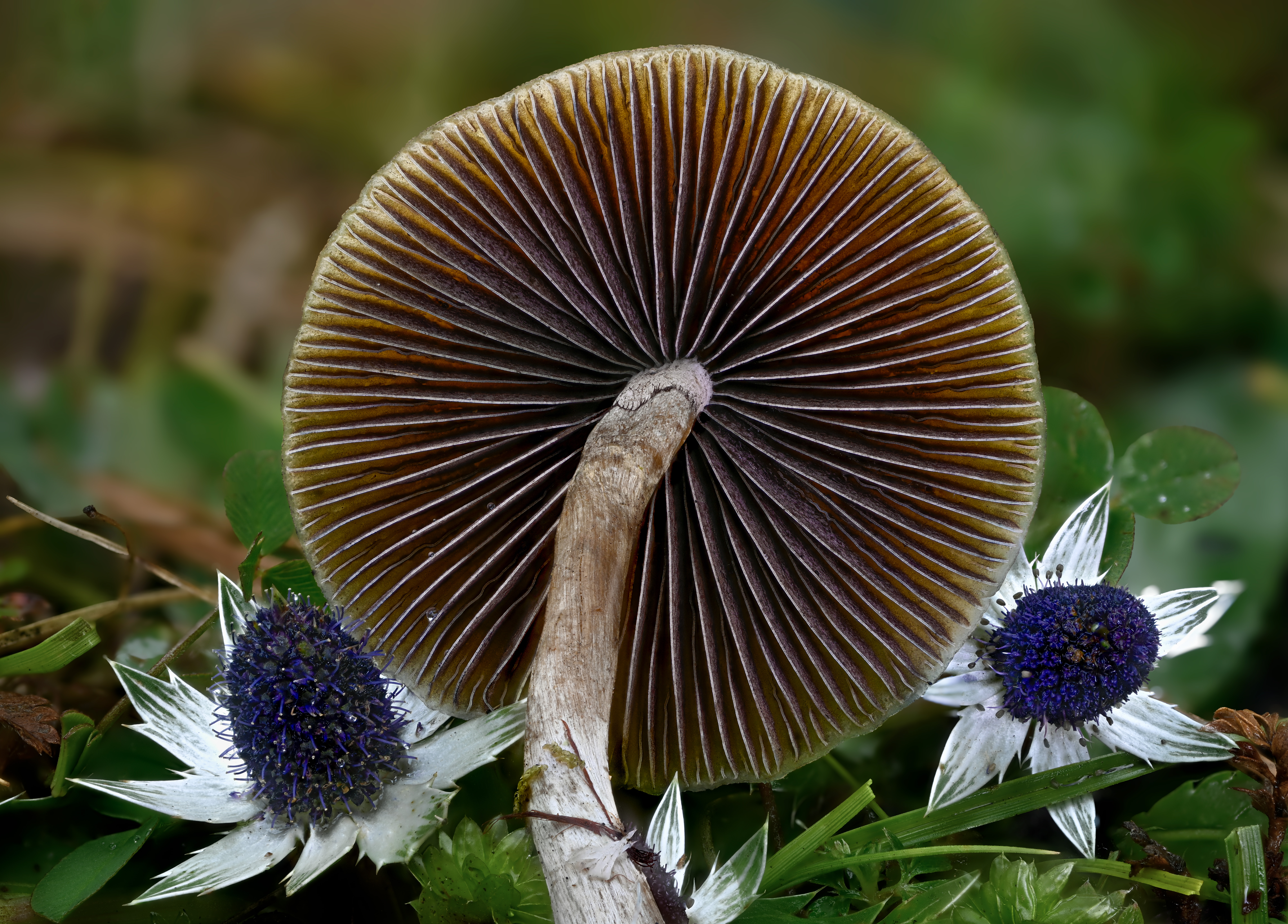
The gills have an adnate or adnexed attachment to the stem, sometimes with whitish edges.

The cap is convex to bell-shaped, sometimes developing a broad umbo before expanding and flattening in age; it reaches a diameter of 1.5–2 cm (0.6–0.8 in). In maturity, the cap eventually forms a central depression, and, in some old specimens, opens into the hollow stem. The cap surface is slimy to the touch, and has translucent striations along the margin when moist. The cap is strongly hygrophanous, meaning that it will change color depending on its level of hydration. The color ranges from yellowish brown to golden yellow in young button forms to brownish gray in age, with greenish-gray tints on the margin. The color later changes to whitish from the center to the margin, finally remaining completely white; dried specimens are straw-colored to pale brownish. In contrast to most psilocybin mushrooms, the cap of P. aztecorum does not have a strong bluing reaction upon injury—only the margin stains slightly green-blue.

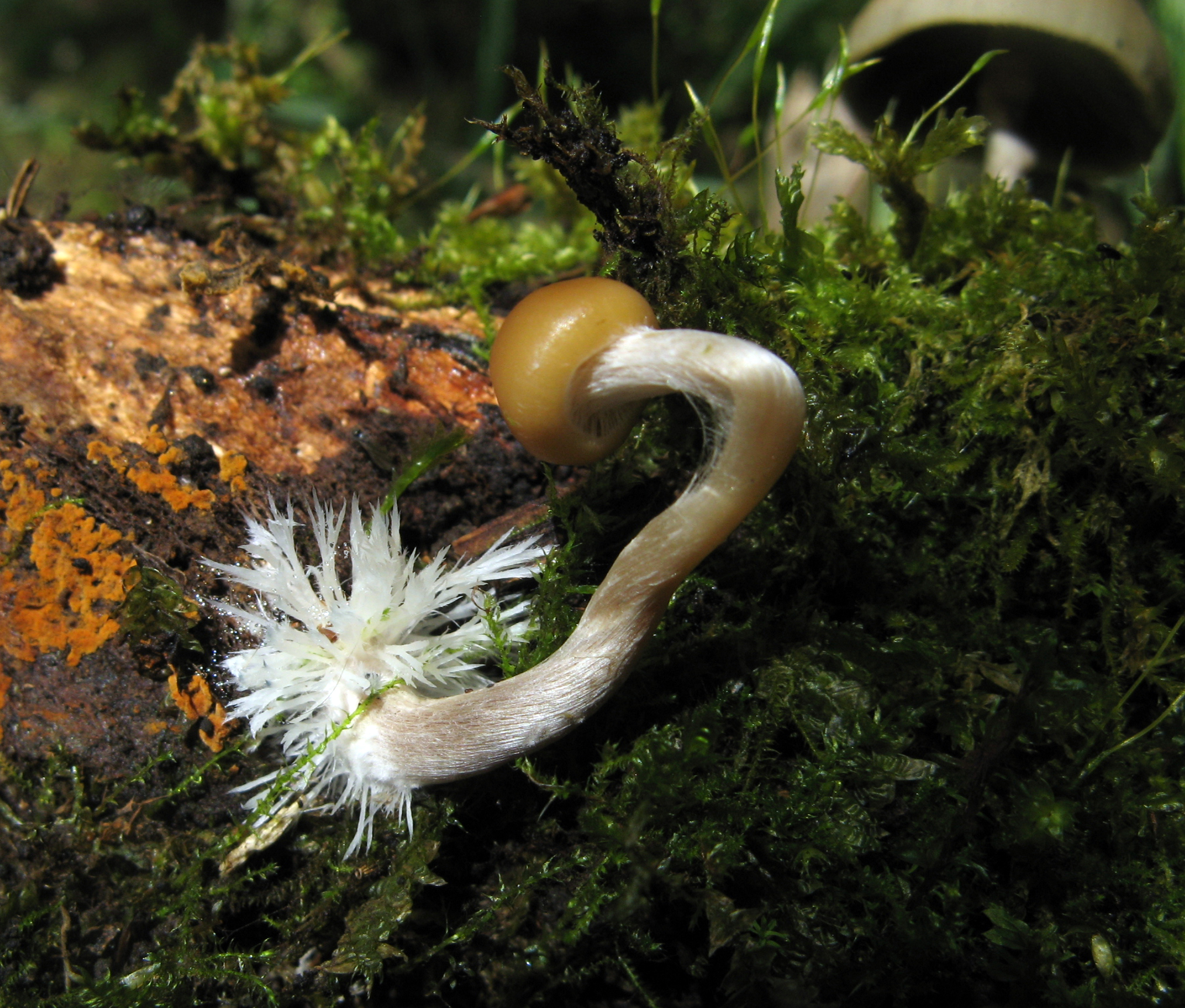
A young specimen with prominent rhizomorphs at the stem base, a silky-fibrillose stem surface, and a cobweb-like partial veil covering the gills

The gills are adnate (broadly attached to the stem slightly above the bottom of the gill) or adnexed (reaching the stem, but not attached to it), and are light violet gray to dark violet brown. They are either uniform in color, or have whitish edges. The hollow stem is 5.5 to 7.5 cm (2.2 to 3.0 in) by 3 to 4 mm (0.12 to 0.16 in) thick, equal in width throughout or thicker at the top, cylindric or sometimes flattened, and either straight or with turns and windings. Its surface is smooth, silky-fibrillose, whitish to greyish, and stains blue-green irregularly when touched or in age. The base of the stem is densely covered with well-developed white rhizomorphs. Young mushrooms have a white cobweb-like partial veil that does not last long before it disappears, although it sometimes remains as a non-permanent ring on the upper part of the stem. The flesh is whitish to yellowish or reddish yellow in the cap, or reddish brown in the stem, and shows little or no bluing reaction to injury. Like most of the bluing Psilocybe mushrooms, the odor and taste of P. aztecorum is slightly farinaceous (similar to freshly ground flour) in fresh specimens; dried specimens have a more intense odor. A drop of dilute potassium hydroxide (KOH) stains the cap, stem, and flesh reddish brown; sometimes, the stem does not stain or stains slightly yellowish red. The spore print is blackish violet.

=== Microscopic characteristics ===
The spores are elongated-ellipsoid in face view, roughly terete (more or less cylindrical but usually tapering at both ends), slightly inequilateral or asymmetrical in side view—the so-called "mango" form. They typically have dimensions of 12–14 by 6.6–7.7 by 6–7.5 μm, although some spores have irregular shapes and are strongly elongated, up to 23 μm. Spores are thick-walled (generally between 1–1.5 μm), dark yellowish brown, and have a broad germ pore. The variety bonetii has smaller spores measuring 10–13 by 6–7.5 by 6–7 μm.

The basidia (spore-bearing cells) measure 24–33 by 6.6–8.8 μm, and may be attached to anywhere from one to four spores, although four-spored basidia are most common. They are hyaline to sometimes somewhat yellowish, club-shaped or roughly cylindrical, and some have a slight constriction around the middle. The cheilocystidia (cystidia on the edge of a gill) are abundant, forming a sterile band on the gill edge. They are hyaline, fusoid-ampullaceous (with a shape ranging from a spindle to a swollen bottle), with dimensions of 20–45 by 5–8.2 μm, and have a filamentous neck measuring 6–11 by 1.6–2.5 μm. The pleurocystidia (cystidia on the gill face) are scattered, similar to the cheilocystidia in form and size, hyaline, and some have bifurcated or branched necks.

Microscopy
Cheilocystidia and spores; small divisions are 1 μm	Basidia	Cap cuticle	Spores

The subhymenium (a layer of cells immediately below the hymenium) consists of spherical cells that are interwoven with hyphae; this layer is hyaline to yellowish or brownish, and does not have pigment crusted on the walls of the hyphae. The epicutis (the upper of two layers of the cap cuticle) is made of a thin gelatinous layer of hyaline or brownish hyphae measuring 1.5–2.5 μm in diameter. The hypodermium (the cuticle tissue layer under the epicutis) is hyaline, and has elongated to roughly spherical hyphae that are 10–18 μm in diameter. Clamp connections are present in the hyphae of P. aztecorum.

=== Similar species ===
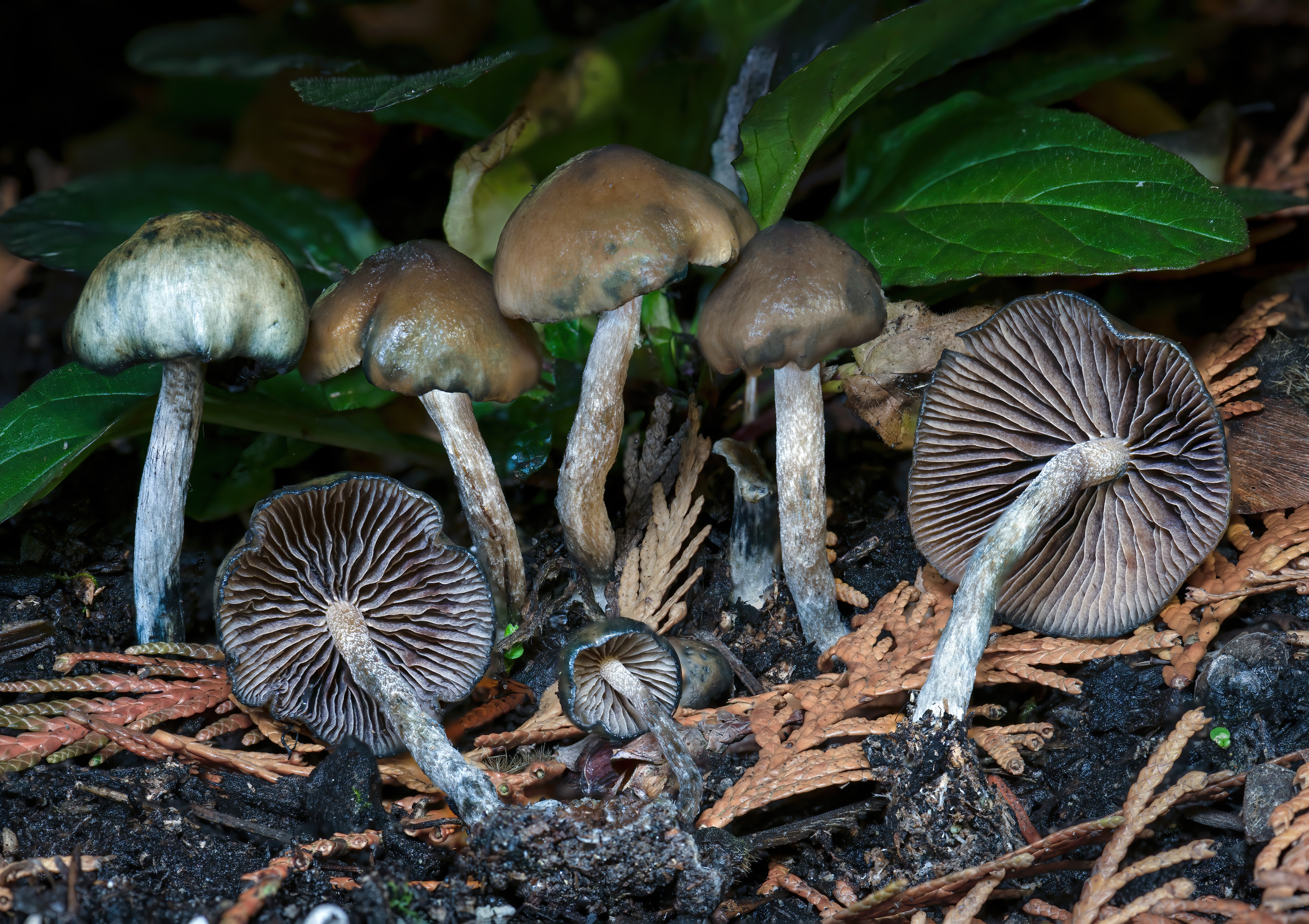
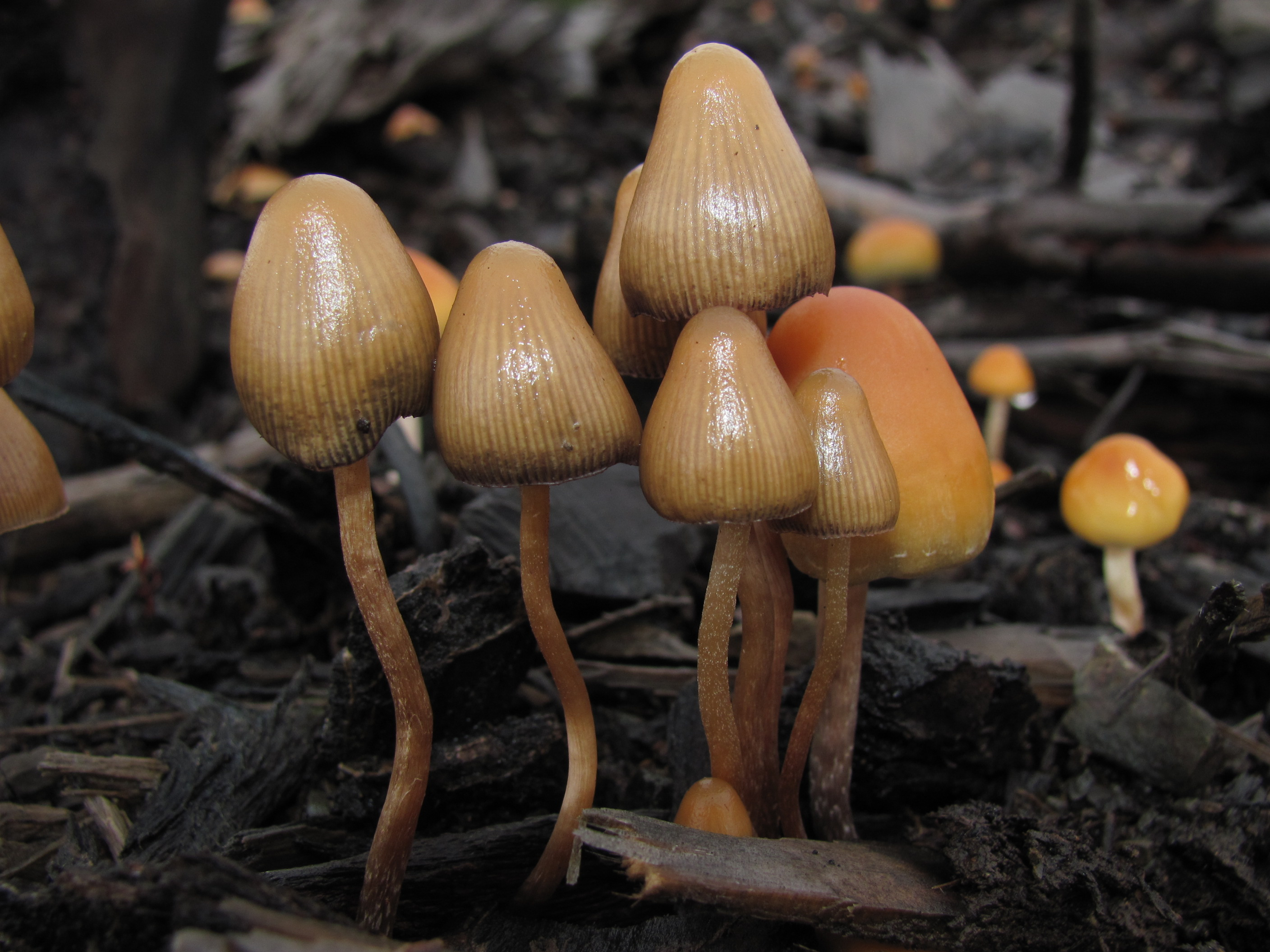
Similar Psilocybe species include P. baeocystis (left) and P. pelliculosa (right).

Psilocybe pseudoaztecorum, found in India, differs from P. aztecorum in the morphology of the pleurocystidia and cheilocystidia. The characteristic filamentous neck present in the cystidia of P. aztecorum is absent in P. pseudoaztecorum. P. pseudoaztecorum had been previously described by K. Natarajan and N. Raman as P. aztecorum, but they published the taxon with a new name after consultation with Guzmán. Fresh specimens of P. aztecorum resemble P. pelliculosa, but this latter species is found only in the Pacific Northwest region of the United States and Canada. Like P. aztecorum, the caps of the South African species P. natalensis also bleach to nearly white when dried. The closely related P. baeocystis also bleaches in color to white when dry. Found in northwest North America from British Columbia to Washington and Oregon, P. baeocystis has thinner cheilocystidia than P. aztecorum (typically measuring 20–32 by 4.4–6 μm) and its pleurocystidia, when present, are found only near the gill edge. P. quebecensis, known only from Quebec, Canada, has pleurocystidia measuring 12–25 by 5–10 μm. Although the phylogeny of the species comprising section Aztecorum is not known with certainty, Guzmán has suggested that P. aztecorum was the ancestor of P. baeocystis in northwestern North America and of P. quebecensis in northeastern North America.

== Habitat and distribution ==
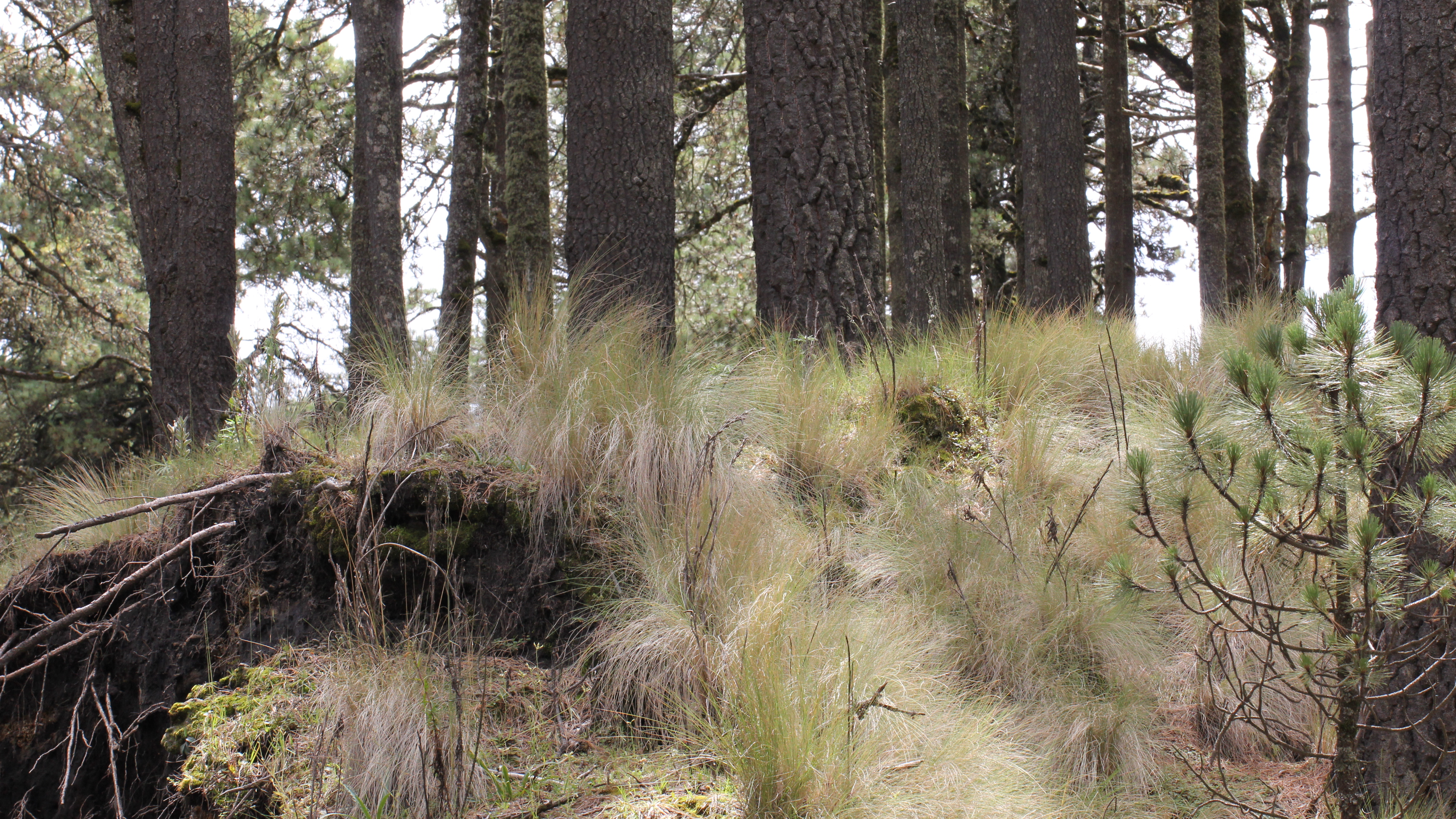
P. aztecorum fruits in high-elevation meadows and open woodlands.

A lignicolous species, Psilocybe aztecorum lives in and decays dead wood, leaves, sticks, or other similar organic debris. Mushrooms typically fruit in groups of 5 to 20, sometimes in bundles. Usual substrates include wood debris buried in soil, twigs or very rotten logs, and, rarely, pine cones. The mushroom is found in woodlands (a low-density forest or wooded area that allows sunlight to penetrate to the forest floor) containing Hartweg's pine (Pinus hartwegii) in addition to grasses such as Festuca tolucensis and Muhlenbergia quadridentata, and the herbaceous plant Alchemilla procumbens, at elevations of 3,200–4,000 m (10,500–13,100 ft). Heim found the type specimens at an altitude of 3,500 m (11,500 ft) in an alpine pine forest. P. aztecorum fruits from August to October.

Psilocybe aztecorum is known only from the high mountains of central Mexico, such as Sierra Nevada, Nevado de Toluca, and La Malinche in the States of Mexico, Puebla, and Tlaxcala. According to Guzmán, it is likely that the species also grows in other areas with high mountains, such as the States of Nuevo Leon, Veracruz, Colima, and Chiapas, which have ecological conditions similar to those of the known localities. Variety bonetii grows in the same substrata as the type variety, mainly on humus, but only in forests with Montezuma pine (Pinus montezumae) and sacred fir (Abies religiosa), between 2,000–3,300 m (6,600–10,800 ft) elevation; it has not been recorded from Hartweg's pine forests. Also known only from Mexico, in the states of Mexico and Morelos, and in the Federal District, P. aztecorum var. bonetii usually fruits from August to November. According to Guzmán, P. aztecorum should be of conservation concern owing to loss of its natural habitat.

== Entheogenic use ==
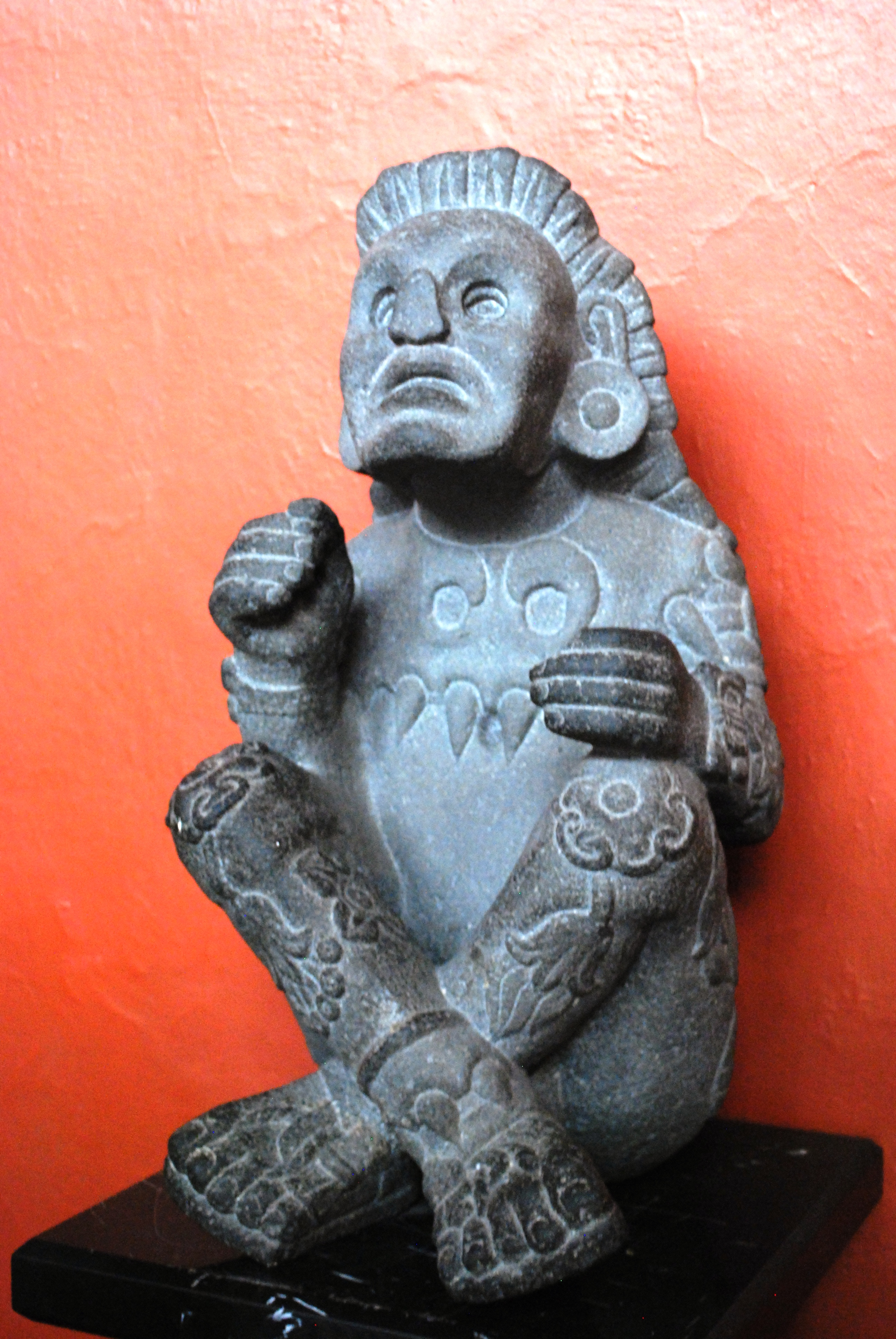
Some of the flower-like decorations on the statue of Xochipilli have been interpreted as P. aztecorum

Psilocybe aztecorum contains the psychoactive compound psilocybin. In 1958, Swiss chemist Albert Hofmann reported a relatively low concentration of 0.02% psilocybin, but this analysis was performed on two-year-old specimens. Jonathan Ott and Guzmán indicated the presence of psilocybin in the variety bonartii. In terms of psychoactive potency, Paul Stamets rates P. aztecorum as "moderately to highly active".

The statue of the Aztec "god of flowers", Xochipilli, a 16th-century stone effigy unearthed on the side of the volcano Popocatépetl, depicts a single figure seated cross-legged upon a temple-like base; his body is covered in carvings of sacred and psychoactive organisms. Circular patterns on his kneecaps, right forearm, and headdress have been interpreted by R. Gordon Wasson as stylized fruit bodies of Psilocybe aztecorum. Wasson says that the convex shape and incurved margins depicted in these images show the mushroom caps just before maturity. P. aztecorum is, in addition to P. caerulescens, one of two mushrooms thought to be the species described by 16th-century Spanish chronicler Bernardino de Sahagún as the teonanácatl. The word teonanácatl (Nahuatl pronunciation: [teoːnaˈnakat͡ɬ]) has been variously translated as "sacred or divine mushroom" or as "flesh of the gods". These mushrooms, considered holy sacraments by the Aztecs, were consumed during spiritual and divinatory rituals to induce hallucinatory visions.

Psilocybe aztecorum is still used ceremonially by the indigenous people of Oaxaca, and by Nahua people in the Popocatépetl region, although this usage is gradually diminishing. Traditional folk healers, or curanderos, maintain familiarity with psychoactive mushrooms (and other mind-altering plants used in ceremonial rituals), and diagnose illnesses by having the client ingest the mushrooms. One Mixe curandero initiation ritual involves ingestion of mushrooms following a period of "abstinence from talking, sexual intercourse, and all foods except nuts for three days, whereupon the individual goes up to a mountain, subsists on nothing but a little honey, and prays to God for the power to heal."

== See also ==
- Legal status of psilocybin mushrooms
- List of psilocybin mushrooms
