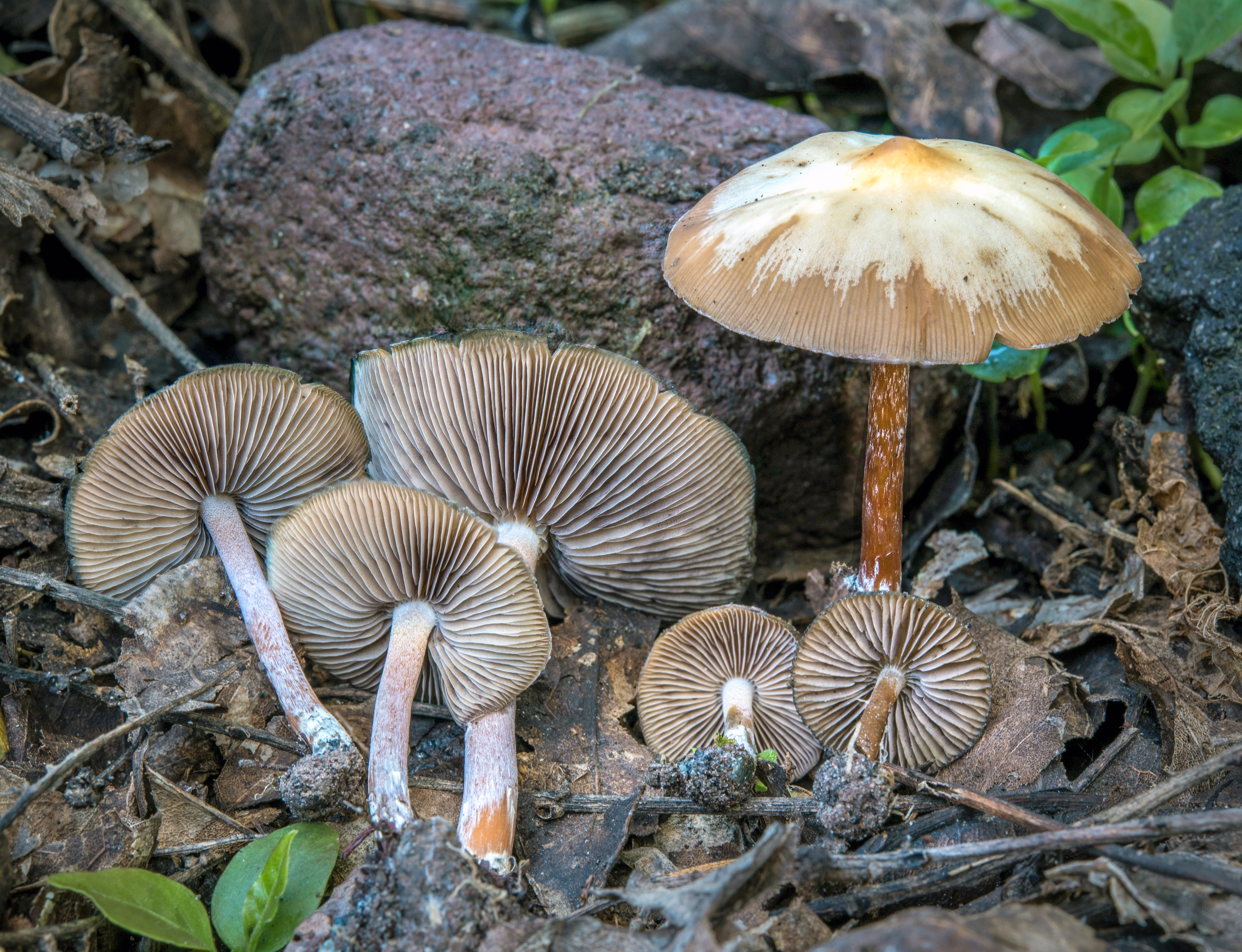

Scientific classification
- Kingdom: Fungi
- Division: Basidiomycota
- Class: Agaricomycetes
- Order: Agaricales
- Family: Hymenogastraceae
- Genus: Psilocybe
- Species: P. caerulescens

Binomial name
- Psilocybe caerulescens Murrill

Synonyms
- P. caerulescens ssp. caerulescens var. albida P. caerulescens var. mazatecorum P. mazatecorum P. caerulescens var. nigripes P. mazatecorum f. ombrophila P. mazatecorum f. heliophila P. mixaeensis P. caerulescens ssp. mazatecorum var. ombrophila P. wrightii P. caerulescens var. ombrophila P. heliconiae P. weilii P. villarrealiae P. subannulata P. bispora P. caribaea

= Psilocybe caerulescens =

Species of fungus

Psilocybe caerulescens
- Mycological characteristics
- Gills on hymenium
- Cap is convex
- Hymenium is adnate or sinuate
- Stipe is bare
- Spore print is purple-brown
- Ecology is saprotrophic
- Edibility is psychoactive

Psilocybe caerulescens, also known as landslide mushroom ("derrumbe" in Spanish), is a psilocybin mushroom having psilocybin and psilocin as main active compounds. Along with Psilocybe mexicana and Psilocybe aztecorum, it is one of the mushrooms likely to have been used by the Aztecs and is currently used by Mazatec shamans for its entheogenic properties.

== Description ==
The taste and smell of Psilocybe caerulescens are strongly farinaceous, reminiscent of cucumber, though the smell lessens with age or when dry.

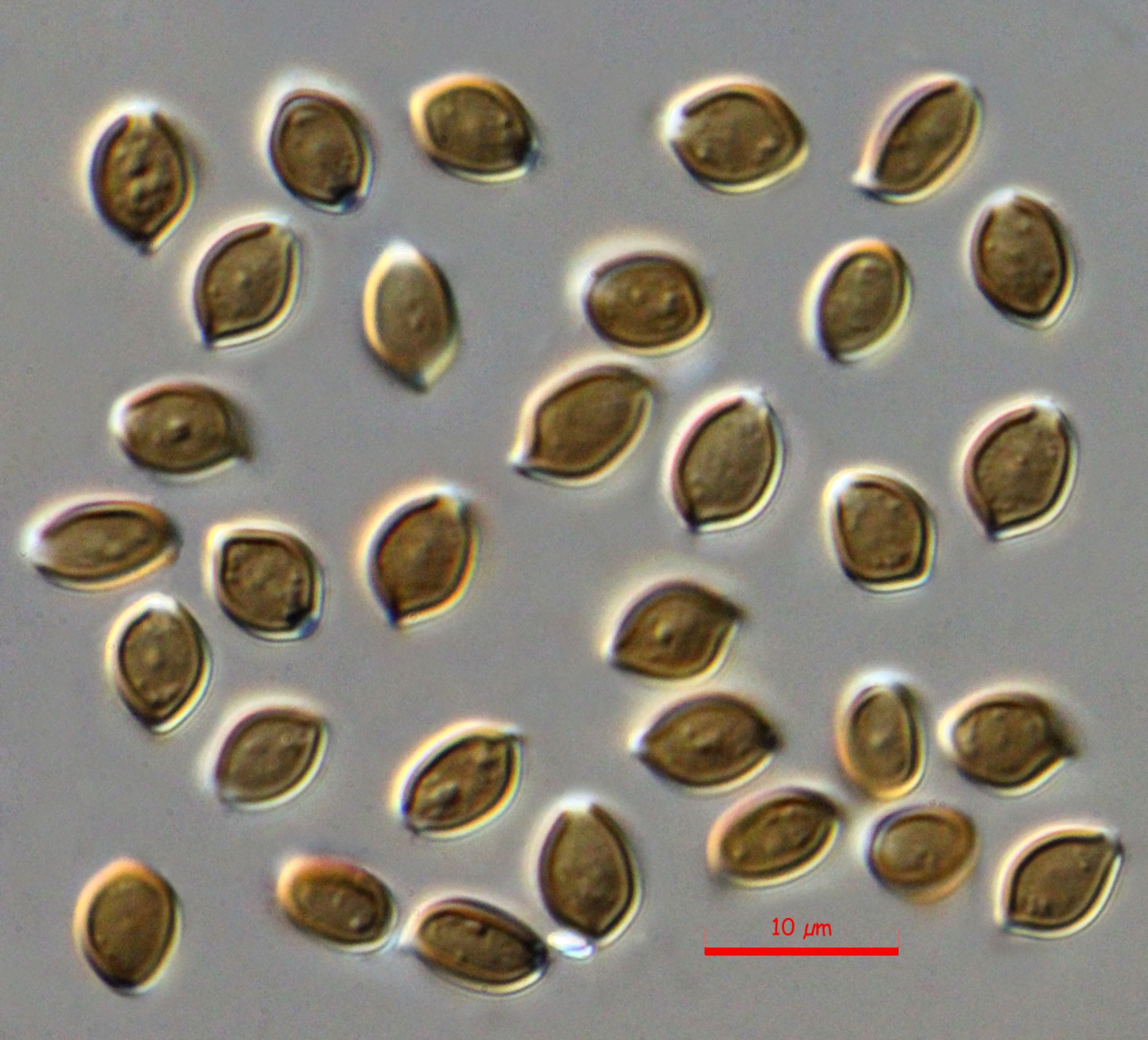
Psilocybe caerulescens spores

== Cap ==
The cap is (1)3–7(10) cm broad. Convex to obtusely campanulate with an incurved margin at first, rarely becoming plane, and often are umbonate or with a slight depression in the center. It is viscid when moist from a separable gelatinous pellicle. The margin is slightly translucent-striate when moist. The cap is hygrophanous, yellowish brown to reddish brown with a silvery-blue metallic luster, paler at the margin, and drying to a beige or straw yellow. It readily bruises blue when handled, the younger specimens bruising bluish olivaceous or even blackish. The cap often has a great variation in color and form.

== Gills ==
The gills are adnate to sinuate and close to subclose. They are whitish, yellowish grey when young, becoming dark violaceous brown to sepia brown with age; the edges remain slightly whitish.

Psilocybe caerulescens spores are dark violaceous brown.

== Stipe ==
The stipe is (2)5–9(13) cm long and (5)8–10(12) mm thick. It is equal or enlarging slightly at the base, and is somewhat flexuous, hollow, and subpruinose to floccose. The stipe is whitish to reddish brown or blackish and readily bruises blue. Rhizomorphs are sometimes attached to the base. The veil is well-developed but does not form a permanent annulus.

=== Microscopic features ===
The spores are hexagonal to subrhomboid in frontal view and ellipsoid in side view, (5.6)6.7–8(9) x (4) 4.8–6.4 (7.2) x 4–4.8 (5.5) μm. The basidia each produce four spores, and occasionally only two larger spores. The cheilocystidia are 16–27(29) x 4.5–8 μm and lageniform to narrowly lageniform, with a flexuous neck that is 1–2.5 μm broad and sometimes bifurcate. Basidia 18.5–22.5 × 5.5–6.5 μm, cylindrical, four spored, hyaline and thin-walled. Pleurocystidia 12–20 (–32) × 4.5–9 (‒10) μm, fusiform, occasionally conical, clavate or utriform, occasionally bifurcate, hyaline, thin-walled. The subhymenium is ramose-inflated. Pileus trama is radial, with hyphae 5–32 μm, yellowish to yellowish brown, thick walled (0.5–1 μm). Pileipellis an ixocutis, (9–) 12–54 μm wide, hyphae 1.5–4 (–5.5) μm diameter, hyaline and thin-walled. Pileocystidia (10–) 12–28 × 4–9.5 μm, globose, cylindrical, clavate, flexuose or pyriform and thin-walled. Stipitipellis a cutis, hyphae 1.5–9.5 μm diameter, yellowish brown, thin-walled (up to 0.5–0.8 μm thick). Caulocystidia (19–) 22.5–49.5 (–56) × 4–8 (–9.5) μm, cylindrical, lageniform, fusiform or, utriform, or lageniform, hyaline and, thin-walled.

== Habitat and formation ==
Psilocybe caerulescens is found growing gregariously or cespitosely, rarely solitarily, from June through October on disturbed ground often devoid of herbaceous plants. It often grows in sunny locations, preferring muddy orangish brown soils with much woody debris. Psilocybe caerulescens was first reported from near Montgomery, Alabama, by Murrill in 1923 on sugarcane mulch, not re-documented from that locality since. It was recently found in South Carolina in September 2008. Psilocybe caerulescens is common and widespread throughout northern Georgia. Found in N. Georgia in 2000.

== Culture ==
The Nahuatls of Necaxa (state of Puebla) use Psilocybe caerulescens and P. mexicana as sacred mushrooms. Is also an important sacred mushroom among the Mazatecs.

The Totonacs (state of Veracruz) used P. caerulescens as well as P. cordispora extensively in the past, though the tradition is now mostly extinct.

P. caerulescens is quite potent and is the mushroom that R. Gordon Wasson consumed in Mexico, as reported in a famous Life magazine article.

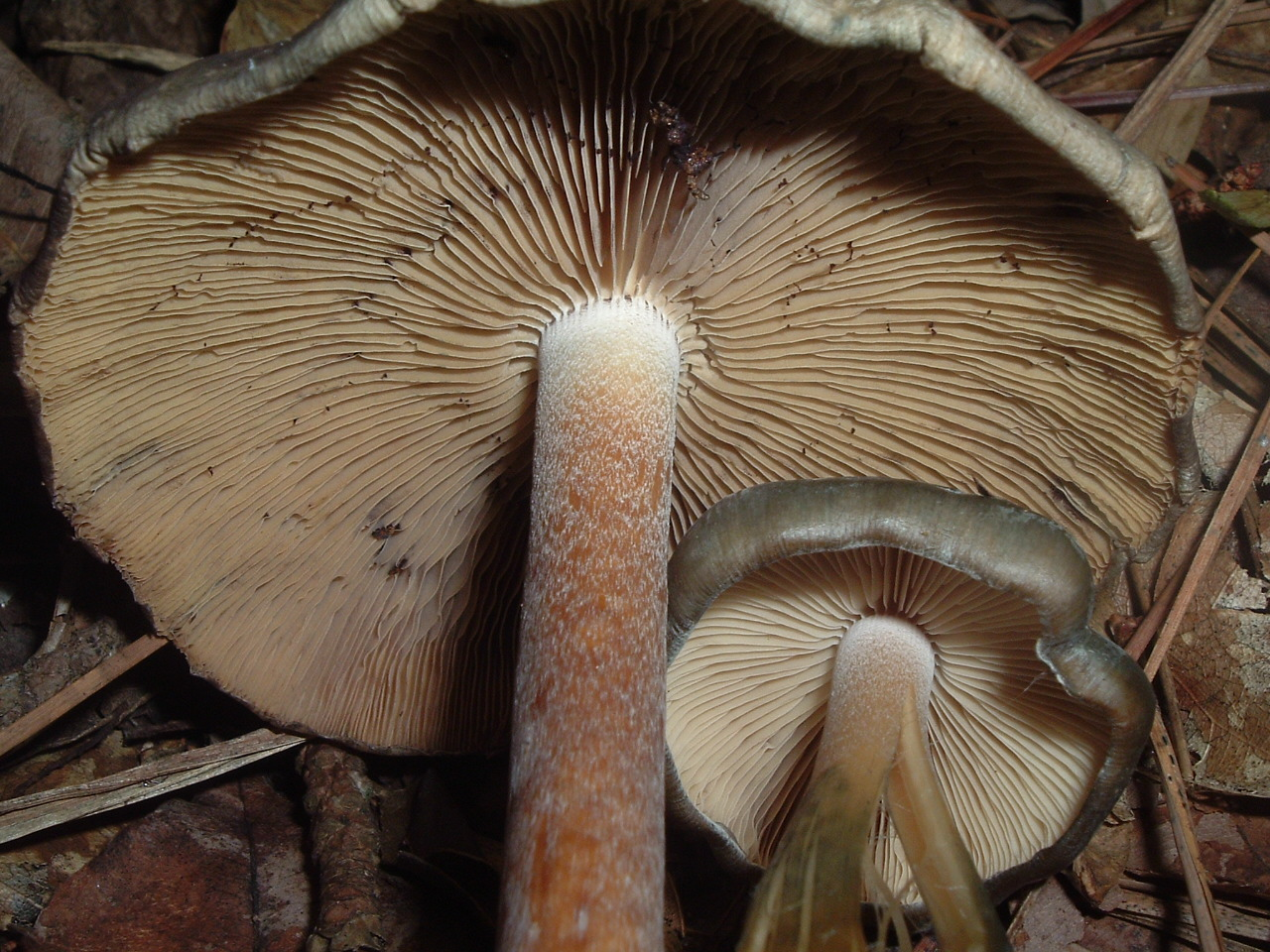
Psilocybe caerulescens

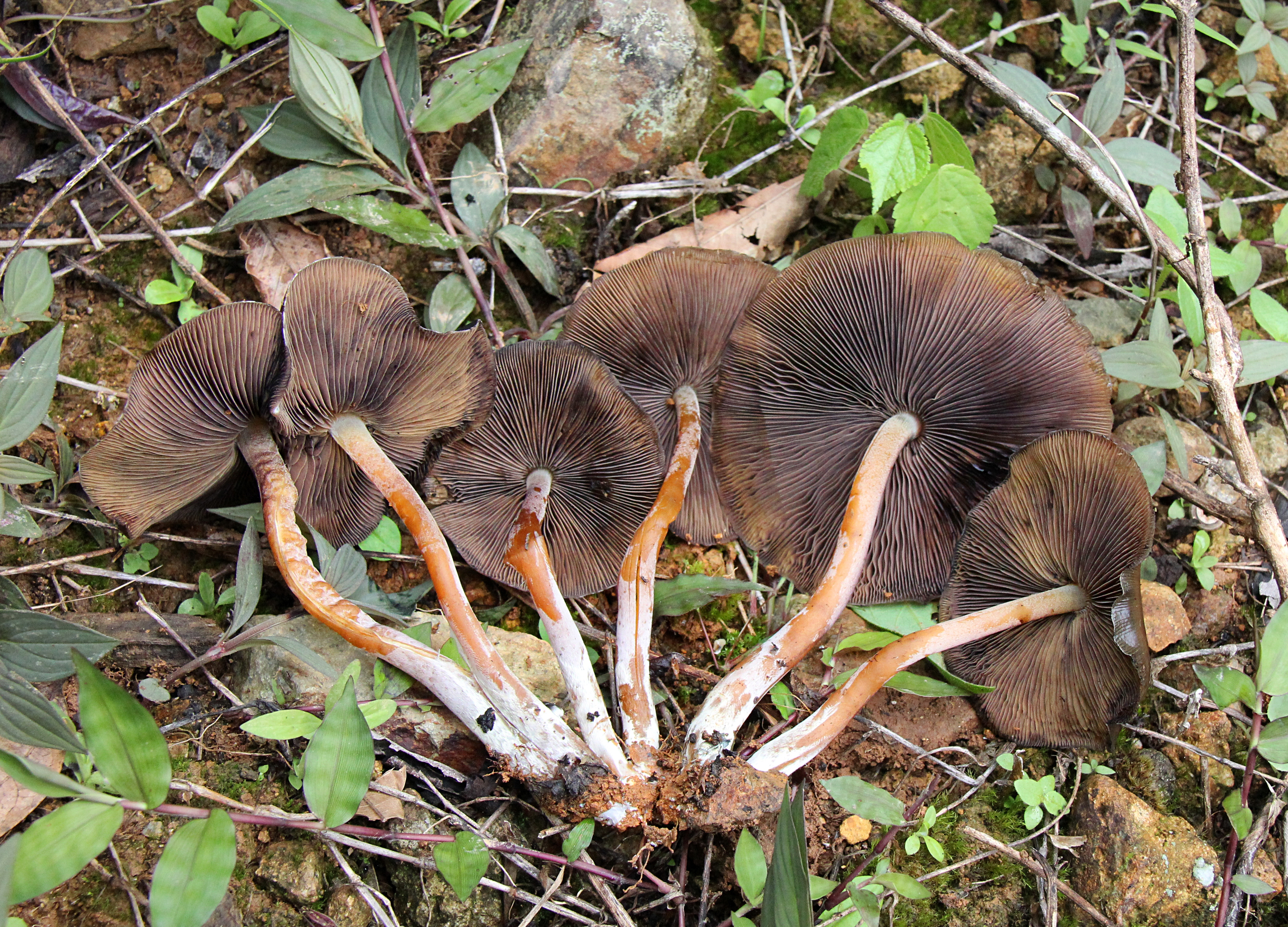
Psilocybe caerulescens

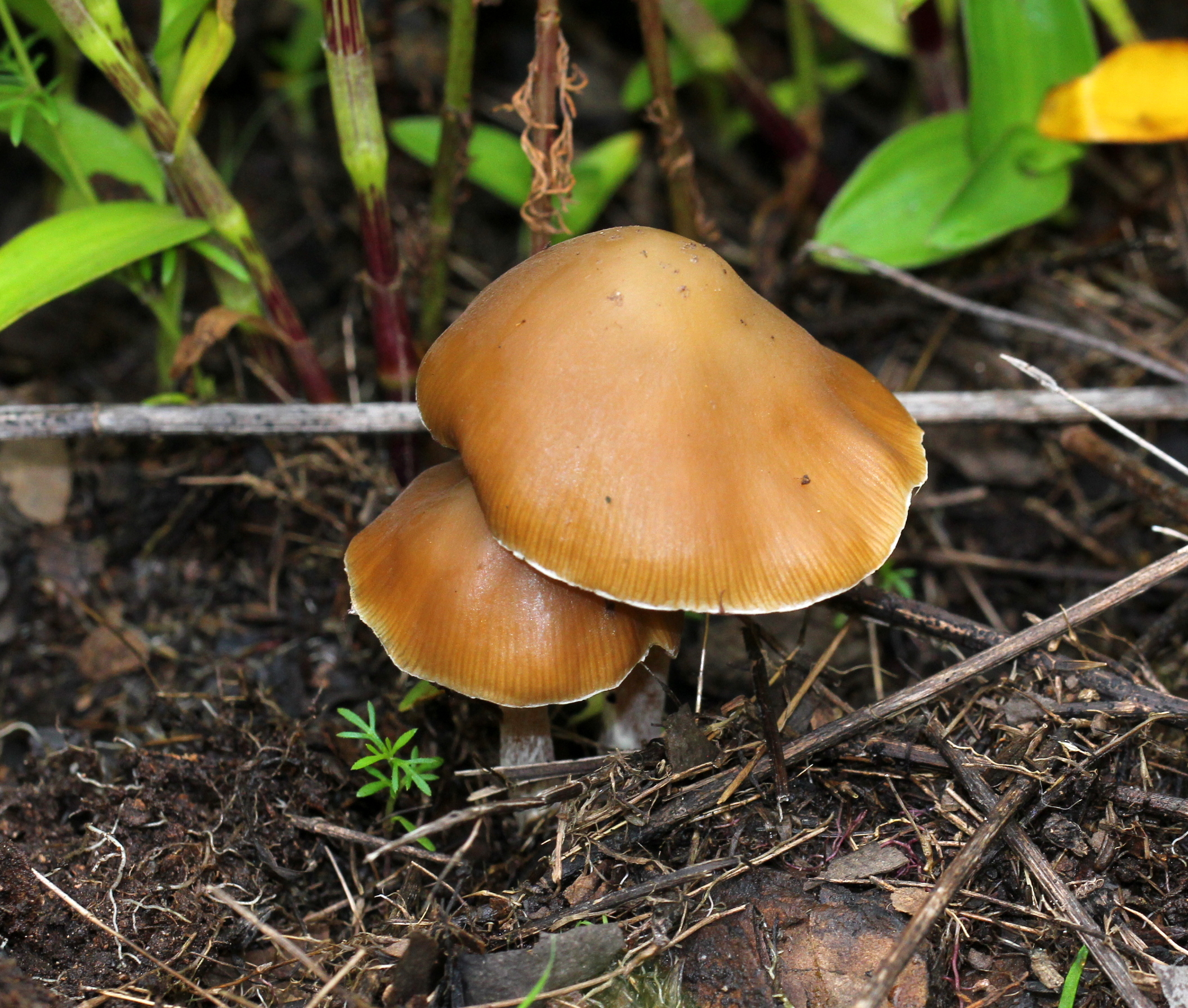
Psilocybe caerulescens

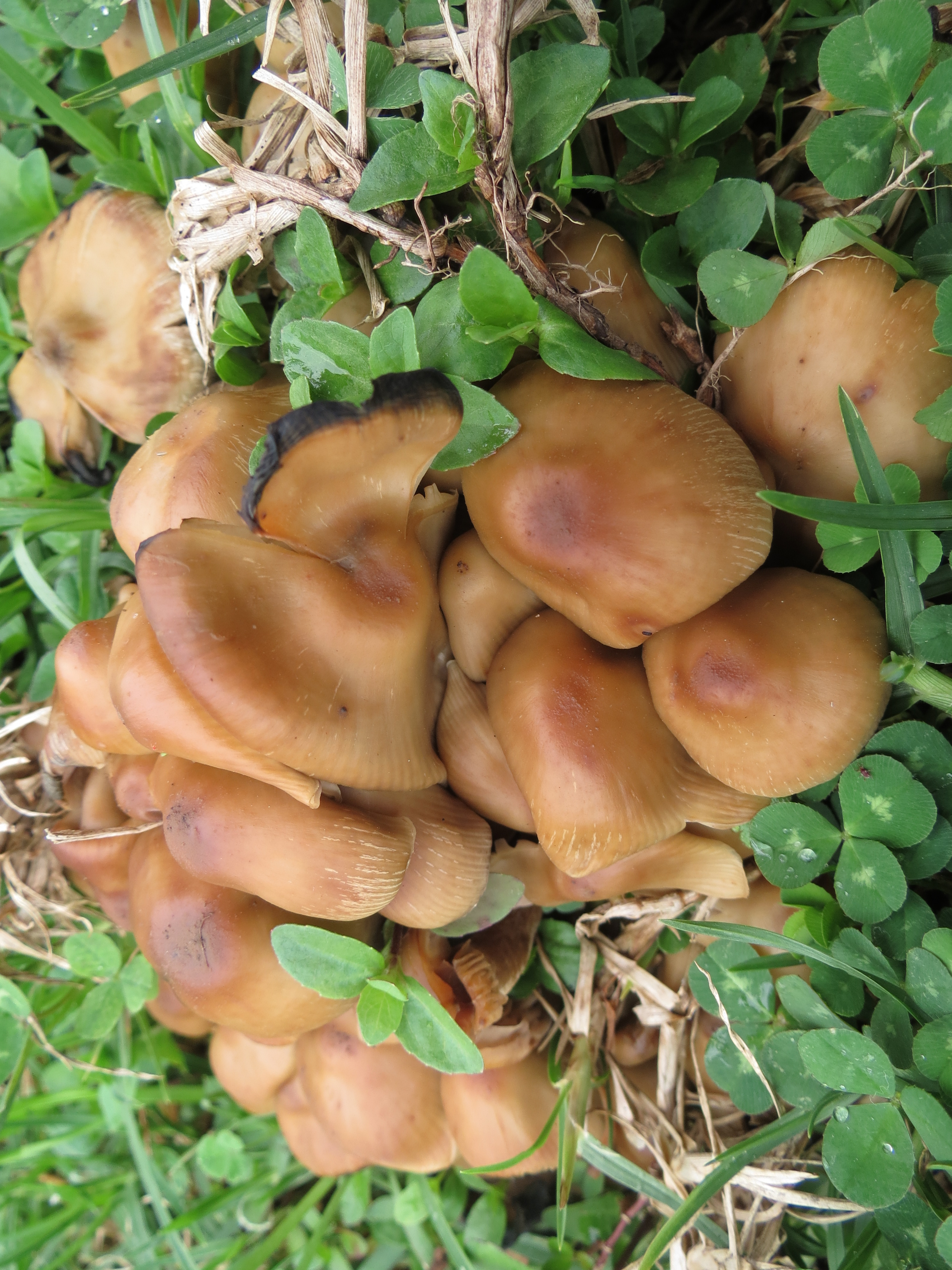
Psilocybe caerulescens from grassland

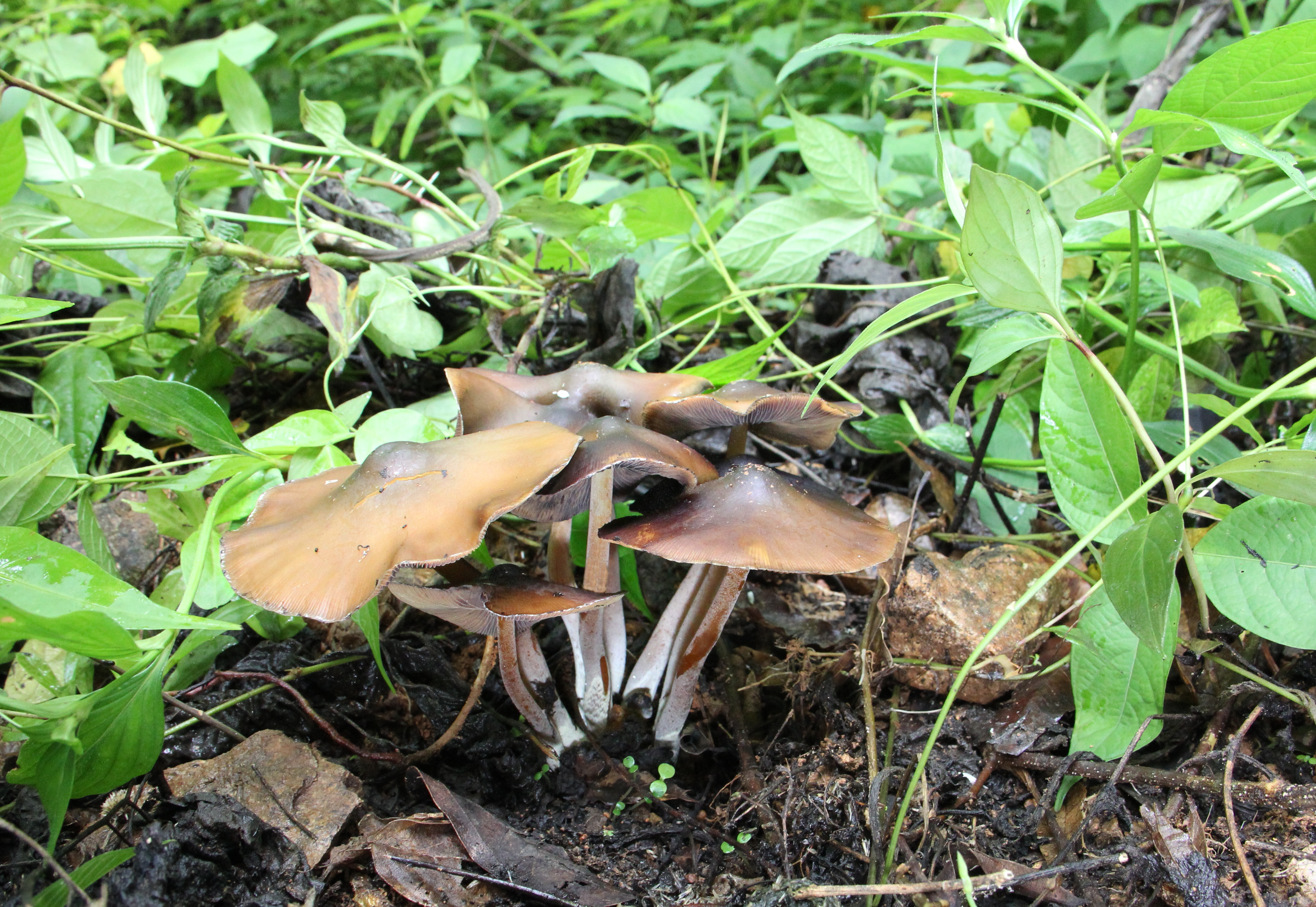
Psilocybe caerulescens from forest floor

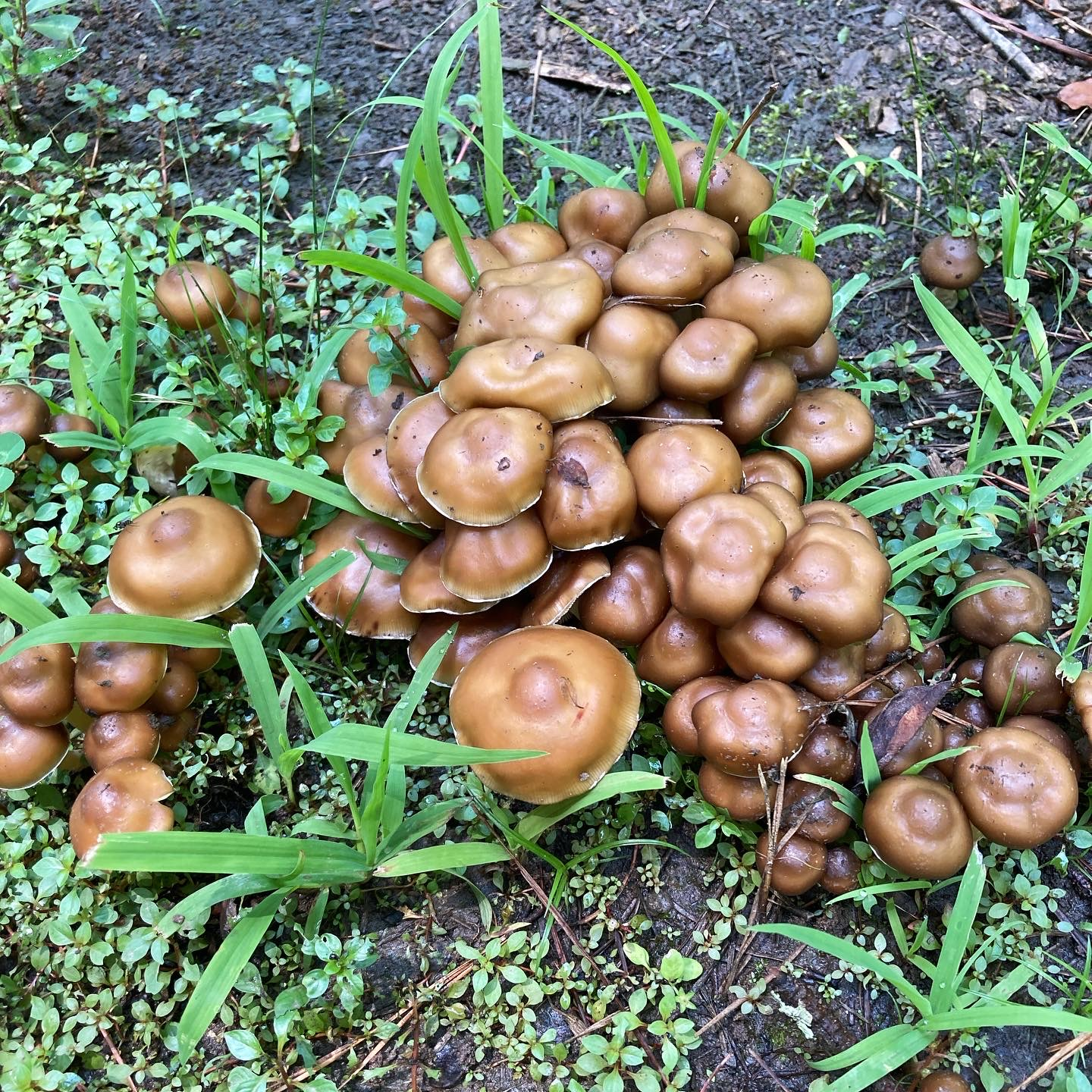
Cluster of Psilocybe caerulescens

== See also ==
- List of Psilocybin mushrooms
