= P. mexicana =

P. mexicana may refer to:

- Prunus mexicana, the Mexican plum, a tree species found in the Midwestern and Southeastern United States as well as Northern Mexico
- Psilocybe mexicana, a psychedelic mushroom species
- Purshia mexicana, the Mexican cliffrose, a perennial flowering small tree species native to western-northern Mexico and the southwestern United States

== See also ==
- Mexicana (disambiguation)
