= Mexica (disambiguation) =

The Mexica were a pre-Hispanic people of central Mexico.

Mexica may also refer to:

- Mexica (board game), a board game designed by Wolfgang Kramer and Michael Kiesling
- Mexica (book), a 2005 novel by Norman Spinrad

== See also ==
- Mexico (disambiguation)
- Mexican (disambiguation)
