= D. mexicana =

D. mexicana may refer to:

- Dasyprocta mexicana, the Mexican agouti, a rodent species found in Cuba and Mexico
- Dioscorea mexicana, the Mexican yam or barbasco de placa, a plant species found in Mexico and Panama

== See also ==
- Mexicana (disambiguation)
