= Mexican =

Mexican may refer to:

== Mexico and its culture ==
- Being related to, from, or connected to the country of Mexico, in North America
  - People
    - Mexicans, inhabitants of the country Mexico and their descendants
    - Mexica, ancient indigenous people of the Valley of Mexico
  - Being related to the State of Mexico, one of the 32 federal entities of Mexico
  - Culture of Mexico
    - Mexican cuisine
    - historical synonym of Nahuatl, language of the Nahua people (including the Mexica)

== Arts and entertainment ==
- "The Mexican" (short story), by Jack London
- "The Mexican" (song), by the band Babe Ruth
- Regional Mexican, a Latin music radio format

=== Films ===
- The Mexican (1918 film), a German silent film
- The Mexican (1955 film), a Soviet film by Vladimir Kaplunovsky based on the Jack London story, starring Georgy Vitsin
- The Mexican, a 2001 American comedy film directed by Gore Verbinski, starring Brad Pitt and Julia Roberts

== Other uses ==
- USS Mexican (ID-1655), United States Navy ship

== See also ==
- Mexican Empire (disambiguation)
- Mexicano (disambiguation)
