= Mexicano =

Mexicano is a Spanish word that means "Mexican" (see: Mexican (disambiguation)).

Mexicano may also refer to:

== People ==
- José Gonzalo Rodríguez Gacha a.k.a. "El Mexicano" ("The Mexican"), a Colombian drug lord who was one of the leaders of the Medellín Cartel
- Rudy Grant, a reggae DJ who has released albums under the stage name "The Mexicano"
- Mexicano, another term for Nahuatl, a group of languages of the Uto-Aztecan language family.

== Other uses ==
- Spanish ship Mexicano

== See also ==
- Mexican (disambiguation)
- Mexicana (disambiguation)
