= Mexican Empire =

Mexican Empire may refer to:

- First Mexican Empire, the dominion under Agustín de Iturbide (Agustín I) from 1821 to 1823
- Second Mexican Empire, the dominion under Archduke Maximilian of Austria (Maximilian I) from 1864 to 1867
