= Mexicana de Aviación =

Mexicana de Aviación may refer to the following Mexican airlines:

- Mexicana de Aviación (1921–2010)
- Mexicana de Aviación (2023–present)
