= Nahuas of La Huasteca =

The Nahua of La Huasteca are an Indigenous ethnic group of Mexico and one of the Nahua peoples. They live in the mountainous area called La Huasteca which is located in north eastern Mexico and contains parts of the states of Hidalgo, Veracruz and Puebla. They speak one of the Huasteca Nahuatl dialects: western, central or eastern Huasteca Nahuatl.

== Location ==
La Huasteca is located in the northeastern portion of Mexico and covers sections of six states: San Luis Potosí, Tamaulipas, Hidalgo, Querétaro, and Puebla. Its eastern border is the Gulf of Mexico and on the western edge is the Sierra Madre Oriental range. Three climatic ranges exist in this region: tierra fria, tierra templada and tierra caliente. This land contains relatively rocky and nutrient-poor soil, except for coastal areas. Historians do not agree, but the coastal Huastecans might have had the first Mexican contact with Europeans, when Américo Vespucio mapped the coast of Veracruz and Tamaulipas in 1497. These coastal Huastecans spoke a language very similar to the Maya, and Vespuci described them well, naming the area Lariab.

== Subsistence and Diet ==
To say that corn is fundamental to the Nahua would be an enormous understatement. It engulfs every aspect of their life. From the actual consumption of corn at every meal, to its political role in the community, there is no escaping its power and influence. Nahua men will actually spend the greater part of their lives farming, while women and children also play a role in land cultivation. With everyone in the community contributing, an occasional cyclical shortage is possible, but normally, food like corn, is copious.

To the Nahua, corn is known not only as a physical life sustainer, but also a spiritual sustainer. It is used at every meal and also feeds domesticated animals. It is the main source of income and is therefore an inevitable constituent in community *politics. Corn can be divided, by color, into four groups. White is superior for human consumption and is sold at the market. Yellow is resilient, thus grown in the dry season and is the corn of choice for domesticated animals. Black and red corns are grown in lesser amounts and are not preferred for eating.

Since the pre-Columbian period, the people of Amatlán have seen little change in their farming practices and thus, their diet. The Nahua use horticulture cycles of slash and burn agriculture in order to grow corn, amongst other staple food. All of the men in the community work the surrounding land with only a steel machete and a digging stick. Individual families also use milpa horticulture (cultivated fields) for the growing of their own choice.

Whereas the larger farming plots are utilized for staple crops, families can choose to grow herbs, flowers and fruit trees (mango, banana, plum, orange, lime) in their personal household garden. Although milpa gardens are labor-intensive, the attention that is put into them often generates high revenue. Sections of the larger plots are segmented for squash, chiles, yucca, amaranth, melons, tomato, herbs and onion. Sugarcane and coffee are grown as commercial crops to be sold at the market.

Domesticated animals are free to roam about the land. Families rarely eat pigs because they are components of income. Pigs are sold at the market along with meat and eggs that are produced from turkeys, chickens and ducks. The elite and wealthy families in the community can be determined by the number of cattle that they are raising. Cattle are costly to purchase and maintain, but are the height of economic activity.

Nahua subsistence strategies also include hunting, gathering and fishing. Gathering is done by women and children and is restricted to times of food shortage. They gather wild products and firewood from the surrounding forest. Hunting, done only by men, is presently a rare practice. Due to deforestation from slash and burn agriculture and an ever-growing human population, animals have migrated south. In the past, hunted animals were commonly deer and pig. Now, animals are limited to the smaller game of rabbit and birds. Compared to hunting and gathering, fishing plays a more important role in the Nahua diet. Men and boys use commercial nylon nets to catch fish, crayfish, and shrimp-like crustaceans. Spear fishing, bow and arrow and stunning fish with firecrackers are other techniques used to catch fish.

Families choose to support their households with a combination of farming, animal husbandry and temporary wage labor. Farming is the most important production activity, thus farmers are always looking to increase their crop size. They will either double-crop (growing two major crops at once), or increase the size of their land. With minimal technology and intense physical labor, managing a larger crop is nearly impossible. Even if a farmer is successful, there is no way for him to transport large loads to the market, or to store surplus. The tropical climate is too damp for the food to keep – not to mention the vermin and insects that will eat the crops. Because farming does not match household expenses, families are forced to grow secondary crops to sell at the market, take on secondary occupations (labor at cattle ranches), or sell their animals at the market.

Women and girls prepare every meal. They spend the bulk of their day making tortillas. They shell corn, boil the kernels, and add mineral lime to the water. Once the corn has softened, it is washed and then ground, three times, with a mano and metate. After all of this is done, the corn is ground and twisted to make a wet paste. The pieces of dough are then slapped together into a circular shape. Throughout meals, women continue making tortillas. Food is eaten from a bowl and tortillas are used as utensils. All meals are based around corn. Dishes include: corn straight off the cob, tortillas and cornmeal dishes of bread, tamales, enchiladas and black beans that are boiled or eaten as a soup. The third major food of the Nahua is squash. It is also boiled, but is sweetened with raw sugar. Fish and crustaceans are placed in a tortilla, cooked whole, or boiled in a cornhusk or banana leaves. Although meat is a rarity, it is prepared as a thick chili sauce. Onion, tomato and a variety of hot chili peppers are added to dishes for increased flavor. Porridge that is composed of amaranth seed and sweetened with raw sugar makes for a popular dessert.

A variety of plants and animals provide a generally nutritious diet. With corn as the principal component of every Nahua meal, protein is sometimes lacking. Compensation can be found in the consumption of beans and fish, and also the meat that men obtain from hunting. Unfortunately, these means are not always available. Lack of protein is not as detrimental to adults, as it is to infants. There is a high incidence of infant mortality in the area that is thought to be associated with this factor. Growing access and availability to sweets, sodas, and processed foods will, no doubt, cause a future epidemic of health problems.

== Religion ==
Before the conquest the Nahua of la Huasteca practed a variant of Aztec religion.

=== Syncretism of Virgin of Guadelupe ===
In some ways the Nahua still worship many of their old deities. One of the most important spirits to the Nahuatl is Tonantsij. This deity represented fertility in the Pre-Hispanic era, but has now come to be identified as the Virgin of Guadalupe. As patroness of Mexico and “honored mother” to the Indians, she has become a link between pre-Hispanic traditions and Christianity. People believe that tonantsij originally came from the sky, but now lives among the mountains as she watches over the village. Her current form is of a statue of the Virgin of Guadalupe usually kept in the village shrine. The development of the Guadalupe story started in the late seventeenth century, and actually may have been related to the development of a “macro-ethnic saint” who could symbolize the larger unit of Mesoamerica. Bachiller Luis Lasso de la Vega created a Nahuatl book directed to an Indigenous audience explaining the legend of the Virgin to the Indians in 1649 and it emphasized the Virgin appearing specifically to the Indians and wanting to help them. The Indigenous villagers worship her as the representation of fertility and life and all the aspects of the earth, sun and water. Her embodiment as Tonantzin especially important for the Nahua—as well as all Indigenous populations—to accept her.

In addition to this syncretism of the development of Guadalupe from Tonantzin, was one of the myths associated with Tonantzin when she gave birth to four sons, tlahualilo, sa hua, Montezuma and toteotsij, the last of which is a representation of the sun and Jesus Christ in his Christian aspect. As the last son, this myth explains how it is believed that the sun-Christ rules our current era. In addition to the Christian god, the Christian devil has also been identified with pre-Hispanic malevolent spirits. Tlacatecolotl (Nahuatl for “man owl”) leads victims to the underworld, and often appears on earth as an owl. His alter ego, tlahualilo, (wrathful one) is the spirit that lurks around graveyards and pre-Hispanic ruins

=== Ritual Celebrations ===
The Nahua still practice many of their ancient traditions, but at the same time they have synchronized and coordinated many of these rituals with the Catholic Church. One major calendrical observance occurs during the winter solstice, from December 21 through December 24, called tlacaelel, which means birth in Nahuatl. During this time, the sun begins to move north as the days grow longer and thus it is associated with birth. During the celebration the shamans open the shrine and remove a plaster statue of tonantsij in the form of the Virgin of Guadalupe; the statue is moved in a line of procession with fanfare in the form of guitarists and violinists who play sacred melodies along with young girls bearing lighted candles. The statue is placed in a house altar, that the villagers had already prepared beforehand and two other plaster statues of lesser significance are placed next to it: the Sacred Heart of Jesus and the Virgin Mary, which are believed to be important for the milpa to be productive.

The Nahua religion is a creative blend of both the Catholic and costumbre religion, and although they have incorporated Christian beliefs and practices in their Indigenous rituals, the basic belief system is very similar to what it was pre-conquest.

=== Curanderos ===
The Curandero, or Shaman, is basically expected to tend to all types of illnesses and disease that are not covered by Hueseros or Parteras, including spiritually-related ones. This responsibility includes diagnosis, pharmacy, divination and ritual leadership. Nahua medicine is closely related to religion and divination, so the curer takes on a both medical and religious responsibility. In the Huasteca region, curers play a somewhat more broad part in the community, speaking at public rites and meetings having to do with crop fertility and church events. The Curer is usually at the same time respected and feared in the community, the result of the healthcare they provide, the knowledge they possess and the sorcery they are thought to be able to perform.

A person chooses, or realizes that they are destined to become a curer by “signs” that curing is one's destiny. Among these signs are recurrent symbolic dreams interpreted by a curer or a miraculous cure from a disease. The person will then enter rigorous training and apprenticeship with an accomplished curer in the community, from which many don't graduate. The process is a complicated and arduous one, in which the master imparts knowledge on the student in exchange for gifts over six or seven years. The training, in all, consists of the learning of chants, altar construction, making suitable offerings to the spirits depending on the situation and knowledge of plants and their uses. Once a student has completed the training, they then must start their own practice and develop a loyal clientele, as daunting a task as completing the training. This can be a stressful and trying time of life because of the many implications and responsibilities that come with being a curer.

Usually after coming to some sort of agreement about payment (money, cigarettes, liquor, food items), based on the seriousness of the illness and the economic situation of the patient, the curer will begin the process of diagnosis of the patient. This can be done in a variety of ways, which, after a simple interview of the patient, include “pulsing”, which is done at the wrists, neck, temples, waist and chest. Divination is also done by reading the patterns of scattered corn kernels, or incense smoke or gazing into crystals lighted from behind with candles. After diagnosis has been made, the curer will proceed to construct an altar consistent with what is needed according to the illness. Altars can include various plants, animals, food items, paper cut-outs, candles, or whatever the curer deems necessary. Some type of ceremony with ritual chants will usually ensue. The curer might then prescribe some type of medicine or ritual.

Nahua suffering from a disease often seek out a shaman to attract the malevolent pathogen away from them. If this does not work, they may seek Western medical treatment but use of shamans is typically first. Shamans attract the life-forces of spirits through cut-outs used during cleansing rituals. These ill-willed spirits have names, associated colors, and representations through paper. They arise from villagers who have died a violent death or who were forgotten by their kinsmen during ceremonies such as the Day of the Dead. They enjoy eating corn, as well as drinking alcohol and smoking tobacco and are continuously floating around looking for a susceptible person in which to enter. These spirits tend to prey on those with less chicahualistli or force such as the young or the elderly. These spirits cause sickness, displeasure or even eventual death. One spirit does not represent one type of disease. Rather, their harm is manifested by different people through different symptoms. However, not all spirits cause ill. Some spirits are protectors and need to be appeased, and Nahua perform occasional rituals simply as a means of appeasing these helpful spirits.

=== Other Types of Healers ===
Hueseros, or Bone-setters tend to fractures and dislocated bones. Parteras, almost always women, help with the birthing process, pre- and post-natal women and their children for a time after birth. Sobadores are concerned with massage therapy.

=== Disease and Paper Figures among the Nahua of Huasteca ===
==== History ====
Paper-making and paper use were important aspects of life in pre-Hispanic Mesoamerica. Paper had ritual significance and religious connections. However, in an effort to remove all traces of traditional religion, Spaniards during the Conquest punished native religion practitioners and burned their religious books and paper offerings. In a 1900 expedition, the anthropologist Frederick Starr made a startling discovery in the remote Huasteca region. He found that religious paper use was still being employed among the Otomí. Several years later, the professor Nicolás León made a similar discovery in a Nahua community. A tradition believed to have died out long ago continued to be practiced, though often concealed from outsiders as a means of preventing religious persecution. Currently, paper use and associated traditional religious rituals continue to be important for the Nahua and serve as a means of asserting their identity in contrast to outsiders.

==== Nahua Worldview ====
According to Nahua worldview, the universe is divided into four realms: the sky, earth, underworld, and “water place”. Myriads of spirits occupy all four realms and affect human behavior to differing degrees. Everything has a yolotl, or life force, as a result being imparted with the universal deity. This includes plants, animals, humans (both dead and alive) and certain objects. Only human beings have both a yolotl, and a tonali, which is roughly translated as talent or aptitude and closely related to individual energy (Sandstrom 1991: 258, 259). Tonali disappears when a human dies, but yolotl remains. Therefore, objects in the environment can influence human action because they too contain an animating heart-soul/life-force.

Sandstrom and Sandstrom divide the paper cut-outs used by shamans into four categories based on the spirit they represent: disease causing spirits (for curing rituals), seed spirits (agricultural productivity), witness spirits (intermediaries between shamans and other powerful spirits), and those adornments which help welcome spirits coming to accept their altar offerings. These spirits are found in all four realms of the universe. It is in manipulating life forces that shamans have power, for example, to cure diseases and ensure agricultural productivity.

==== Disease and Paper Figures ====
Knowledge of Nahua worldview provides valuable insight into the study of disease in their communities. Rather than locating disease in an anatomical organ system or seeking a pathogenic cause for the physical malady, such as in Western biomedicine, Nahua look to the ultimate causes for “disharmony or imbalanced that has occurred between the patient and his or her physical and social surroundings”. Curing rituals, performed by shamans, help restore harmonic balance and therein work to eliminate the disease by uncovering why a spirit might choose to affect the patient.

Understanding reasons for the spirit indwelling is the first component of the ritual. Shamans use divination to uncover this rationale and causes often include “sorcery, gossiping neighbors, an angry house spirit, stumbling, falling, or any other occurrence in which a person is suddenly frightened…or any act or failed obligation on the part of the patient that has angered earth, water, or celestial spirits or the soul of a deceased kinsman”. Once the spirit is identified it can be removed. This removal allows the weakened patient to be able to renew their supply of energy and heal. The removed spirit is then provided offerings to prevent it from being offended.

The spirits most often portrayed in shaman paper figures are ejecatl, so named because they are said to travel on gusts of wind. The notion of bad airs is common throughout Mesoamerica, but the idea is particularly vivid and physically represented with Nahua paper figures. Shamans attract these spirits through cut-outs of the spirits used during cleansing rituals. These spirits have names, associated colors, and representations through paper. They represent the spirits of villagers who have died a violent death or who were forgotten by their kinsmen during ceremonies such as the Day of the Dead. They enjoy eating corn, as well as drinking alcohol and smoking tobacco and are continuously floating around looking for a susceptible person in which to enter. These spirits tend to prey on those with less chicahualistli, or force, such as the young or the elderly.

Ejecatl cause sickness, displeasure or even eventual death. One spirit does not represent one type of disease. Rather, the spirit's harm is manifested by different people through different symptoms. (It also must be stressed that not all spirits are harmful; some serve as protectors and need to be appeased. Rituals are a means of appeasing helpful spirits to placate them and seek their blessing.) Ejecatl typically lurk around such areas as graveyards, bathing areas, and houses. They move around frequently and find their way into unexpecting or weak villagers passing by. Villagers often have paper cut-outs of protecting spirits near their homes. Sorcerers also influence these spirits for evil by using paper cuttings to “attract the spirits and direct them to specific victims”. Frequently, they also change into animals and find their victim at night.

Through human action (humans are more capable than other object in the Nahua universe to disrupt the harmonic balance), Nahua misdeeds can lead to disease and misfortune. Community members must continually make offerings to placate these spirits and maintain the very important notions of balance and harmony. These gifts serve to cover errant actions and ensure continued blessings from the spirits such as health and protection from disease.

==== Aspects of the Ceremony ====
The number of paper figures cut for rituals varies, according to Sandstrom, from 50 paper figures for medium-sized to curing rituals to approximately 25,000 for a village rain ritual. Curing rituals vary in length, cost, elaborateness based on the severity of the problem and on the shaman's potency in curing. Paper figures do not have power until sacralized by the shaman, typically by means of using smoke.

Villagers may seek shamans outside of their village based on a shaman's reputation and availability of resources for the patient. Both males and females can be shamans involved in the tleuchpantle, or cleansing ritual. A good shaman must have extensive knowledge of paper-cutting. The colors, names, originations and representations are all important in paper-cutting. Also, certain spirits strike certain types of people at certain times of the day. Shamans must have a knowledge of all this. However, each shaman develops his own style for paper cutting. 90% of a shaman's responsibilities are curing rituals, and their continued employment by villagers depends on their charisma and proven healing abilities. Despite knowledge of existing figures, shamans can create new paper figures all the time. Sandstrom and Sandstrom write “Variations in paper cut-outs reflect the ritual specialist’s attempt to distinguish himself as an effective intermediary between humans and spirits. Underlying all of the variations, however, is a shared set of assumptions about the nature of the spirit world and the strategies effective in dealing with it”. In the midst of the diversity and vast number of paper figures, there is remarkable similarity among these cut-outs. This unity represents the commonality of life-force found throughout the Nahua universe. The job of ritual specialists, namely shamans, is to help regulate harmony and balance with the world surrounding the Nahua.

=== Earth Pantheon ===
The Nahua of Huasteca believes there are four realms of the universe. The first is the earth, the second is the sky, the third is underwater and the fourth is called mictlan, which means place of the dead in the Nahua language and is within the earth. It is thought to be a shadowy place where the souls of people who have died normal deaths reside. Those individuals who die from drowning or being struck by lightning are said to reside in apan, an underwater realm. There are two types of souls, yolotl or the life force and the tonali or the heart soul. The tonali is the soul that resides in mictlan. In mictlan, the souls are believed to remarry and live as they did on earth, farming and living in villages as they did before they died.

A very important aspect of the death culture of the Nahua of Huasteca is the ritual offerings given to the heart-soul of the dead kinsmen. These offerings are given in order to feed the souls, as well as to appease the dead kinsmen so they do not become ejecatl spirits and they stay in mictlan. These ejecatl spirits can cause disease, death and much misfortune for the living. It is thought that these ejecatl spirits are especially present around graveyards, which is why the burial grounds are placed far away from the homes in the village. Infants who die are not seen as threatening, so they are usually buried within the family compound.

The main observance of death starts on October 18. On this day the Nahua celebrate the death of the earth, as it is now fall. After this date the tonalli roam the earth searching for their kinsmen. The living individuals set up an altar on October 30 to welcome the dead souls of their kin. A flower trail is placed from the altar to the door, to guide the tonalli to the offerings. Every day, until November 1, the family members place a warm meal on the altar three times a day. The family members allow the spirits to eat and then consume what is left. On November 2, the most well known ritual occurs. This is Dia de los Muertos or the Day of the Dead. On this day, the family packs a feast and heads to the graveyard, where they clean and decorate the grave of their kinsmen and partake of the meal. All the people are well dressed and the festivities are colorful and exuberant. The offerings made on this day are for adult souls. The offerings made the previous days are for the souls of young children. Since it is thought that some individuals neglect their dead ancestors, an altar is placed outside the village to appease those spirits as well....

Titeixpiyaj is the name for the funeral ritual. It is held within one day after death, although the reason for this is not explained. The body is placed on a platform with the arms folded across the chest and a white cloth placed over the face. Marigolds or flor de los muertos are very important for the death ritual. Marigold circlets are placed on the body, there is also a trail of marigolds or ojtli is strung from the feet of the body all the way to a roof beam over the corpses head. The “trail of marigolds is supposed to guide the tonali on the journey out of the body. There are also beeswax candles on stakes in the ground on three sides of the body. While these beginning stages of the ritual are occurring, a carpenter is building a coffin out of cedar and the family is standing a 24-hour vigil. During the vigil, relatives and neighbors are bringing gifts to the family. These gifts include “raw sugar cane alcohol, corn, beans, soft drinks, candles and prepared foods,” (Sandstrom 1991:297). Women break into ululations and both males and females weep. Also during this spectacle a male member of the family is reading Catholic prayers aloud in Latin

The day of the burial comes with much ritual as well. There is a cross made white ash on the bottom of the coffin, followed by a white cloth and a set of men's or women's clothes, depending on the individual being buried, for the new spouse in the underworld. The individual is also supplied with plates, cups and a machete for their new home mictlan. The body is wrapped in ojtli seven times, holding seven crosses with the wrapping and is then placed in the coffin

The procession to the graveyard begins with the removal of the body from the house. Sometimes, a new door is cut into the house in order to take the body out, so that the spirit will be confused and will not easily find its way back home. The pallbearers also step on the plates and cups of the individual as they leave house, in order to destroy ties the spirit has to the living world. Women are at the front of the procession holding candles. The four pallbearers proceed directly after the female members of the procession and are followed by the rest of the men and boys of the group. Once the procession arrives at the graveyard, the hands of the deceased are placed at their sides and the plates and cups in the coffin are broken. The coffin is placed in the grave, with a wooden platform built over top. The dirt is then shoveled onto the platform instead of directly on the coffin. A cross covered in marigolds is then placed at the head of the individual.

A week after the funeral rite, the first offering occurs as was described during the Day of the Dead. This initial ritual signifies the “final departure of the dead soul to the underworld,”. Periodic offerings occur throughout the year, but exactly one year after the death, a major offering occurs. These offerings occur for the next four years. This occurs for four years, because the Nahua believe that after four years, the body has disintegrated and the soul of the individual is no-longer threatening .
