= Mexicana =

Mexicana may refer to:

- Mexicana de Aviación, a list of airlines based in Mexico
- Mexicana (ship), a topsail schooner built in 1791 by the Spanish Navy
- Mexicana (film), a 1945 American film
- Mexicana (flatworm), a genus of monogenean parasites
- Mexicana (website), a web portal
- Mexicana (soft drink) (Mexicana Con Orgullo), a Mexican soft drink

== See also ==
- Mexican people
- Mexicano (disambiguation)
