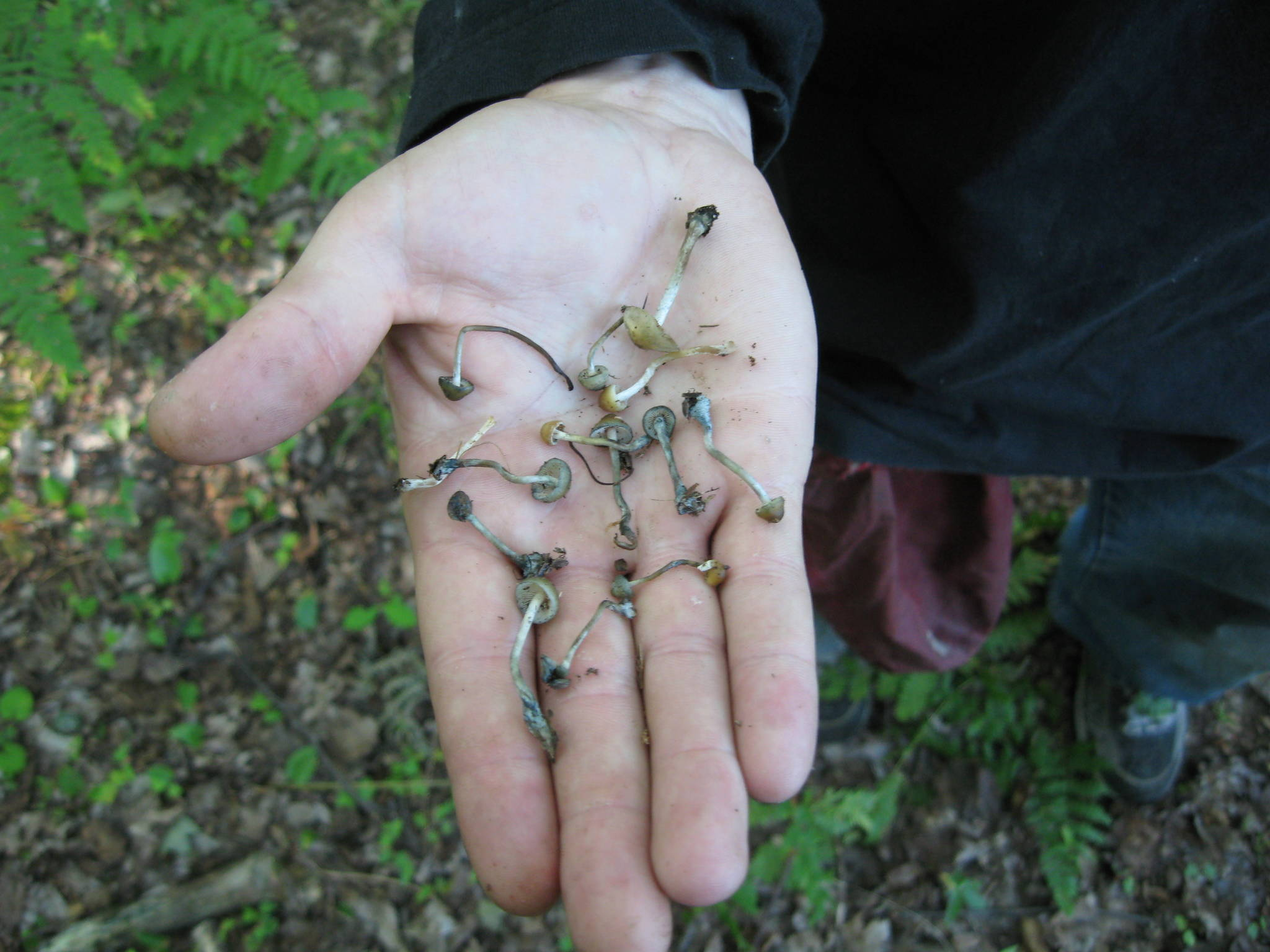

Scientific classification
- Kingdom: Fungi
- Division: Basidiomycota
- Class: Agaricomycetes
- Order: Agaricales
- Family: Hymenogastraceae
- Genus: Psilocybe
- Species: P. quebecensis

Binomial name
- Psilocybe quebecensis Ola'h & R. Heim 1967

= Psilocybe quebecensis =

Species of fungus

Psilocybe quebecensis
- Mycological characteristics
- Gills on hymenium
- Cap is convex or conical
- Hymenium is adnate or sinuate
- Stipe is bare
- Spore print is purple-brown
- Ecology is saprotrophic
- Edibility is psychoactive

Psilocybe quebecensis (preferred synonym: Psilocybe aztecorum) is a moderately active hallucinogenic mushroom in the section Aztecorum, having psilocybin and psilocin as main active compounds. Native to Quebec, it is the most northern known psilocybin mushroom after Psilocybe semilanceata in northern Scandinavia. Macroscopically this mushroom somewhat resembles Psilocybe baeocystis.

== Etymology ==
Named for the province Quebec, where it was discovered.

== Description ==
- Cap: 1–3 cm (0.39–1.18 in) (3.5 cm or 1.38 in) in diameter. Nearly hemispheric to convex at first, becoming subcampanulate to more or less plane when mature, viscid and even to translucent-striate when moist, hygrophanous, brownish to straw colored, yellowish to milk white when dry. Surface smooth, may become finely wrinkled with age, flesh whitish. Readily stains blue-green where injured.
- Gills: Adnate, thin, moderately broad to swollen in the middle. Grayish yellow with green tones becoming dark brown at maturity, with the edges remaining whitish.
- Spore Print: Dark purplish brown.
- Stipe: 2–3.5 cm (0.79–1.38 in) (4.5 cm or 1.77 in) long by 1–2 mm (0.039–0.079 in) (2.5 mm or 0.098 in) thick. Equal, slightly subbulbous, smooth to striate, brittle, tough, and fibrous, base is furnished with long conspicuous rhizomorphs. Yellowish or brownish towards the base, whitish when dry, partial veil cortinate, and soon disappearing, no annulus present, readily bruises blue.
- Taste: Somewhat farinaceous
- Odor: Farinaceous
- Microscopic features: Spores ellipsoid to subovoid in side and face view some spores mango shaped, 8.8–11 μm (16 μm) × 6.6–7.7 μm (8.8 μm). Basidia 15–20 μm (28 μm) 4-spored. Pleurocystidia present, 12–25 μm (35 μm) × (3 μm) 5–10 μm (15 μm), relatively polymorphic, often fusiform-ventricose or ampullaceous. Cheilocystidia (18 μm) 22–36 μm × 5.5–8.8 μm (10 μm), fusoid-ampullaceous with an extended neck, 2–3.3 μm thick, abundant, forming a sterile band, sometimes with a hyaline viscous drop at the apex.

== Habitat and formation ==
Solitary to gregarious, rarely cespitose, on rotting wood, particularly in the outwashes of streams in the decayed-wood substratum of alder, birch, fir and spruce in the late summer and fall. Reported from Quebec, Canada specifically in the Jacques-Cartier River Valley, fruiting at a temperature of 6 to 15 °C (43 to 59 °F) from summer to late October. Recently found in the United States (Michigan). Originally discovered in 1966, P.Quebecensis has also been confirmed growing in at least one area within Cape Breton, Nova Scotia.
