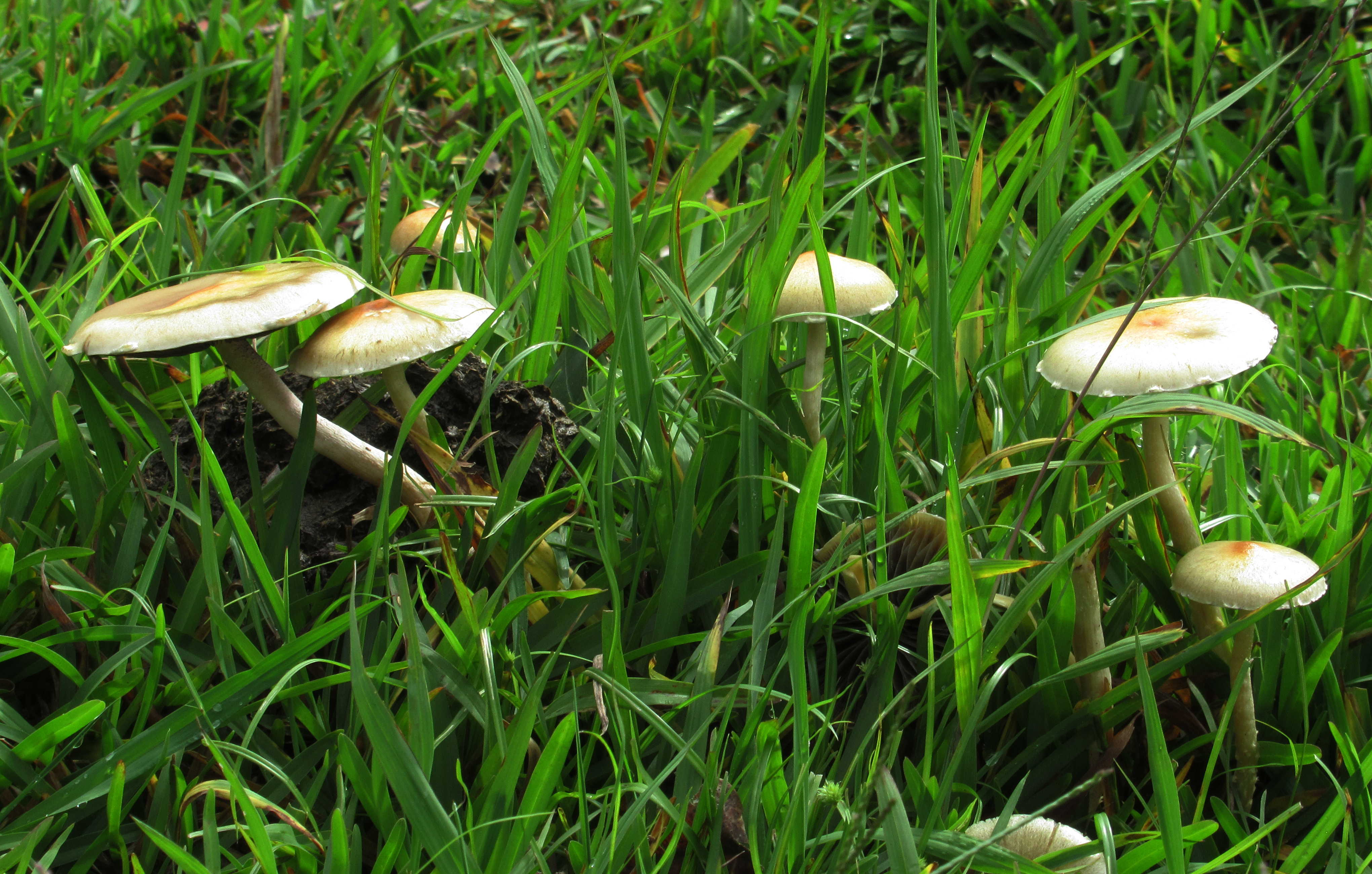

Scientific classification
- Domain: Eukaryota
- Kingdom: Fungi
- Division: Basidiomycota
- Class: Agaricomycetes
- Order: Agaricales
- Family: Hymenogastraceae
- Genus: Psilocybe
- Species: P. pseudoaztecorum

Binomial name
- Psilocybe pseudoaztecorum Natarajan & Raman 1985

= Psilocybe pseudoaztecorum =

Species of fungus

Psilocybe pseudoaztecorum is a species of mushroom in the family Hymenogastraceae.

It was described from the state of Tamil Nadu in India. This species produces viable amounts of psilocybin in the mycelium phase and is used by mushroom growers for the myceliated grain technique.

== See also ==
- List of Psilocybin mushrooms
- Psilocybin mushrooms
- Psilocybe
