= Psychedelia =

1960s subculture related to the use of psychedelics

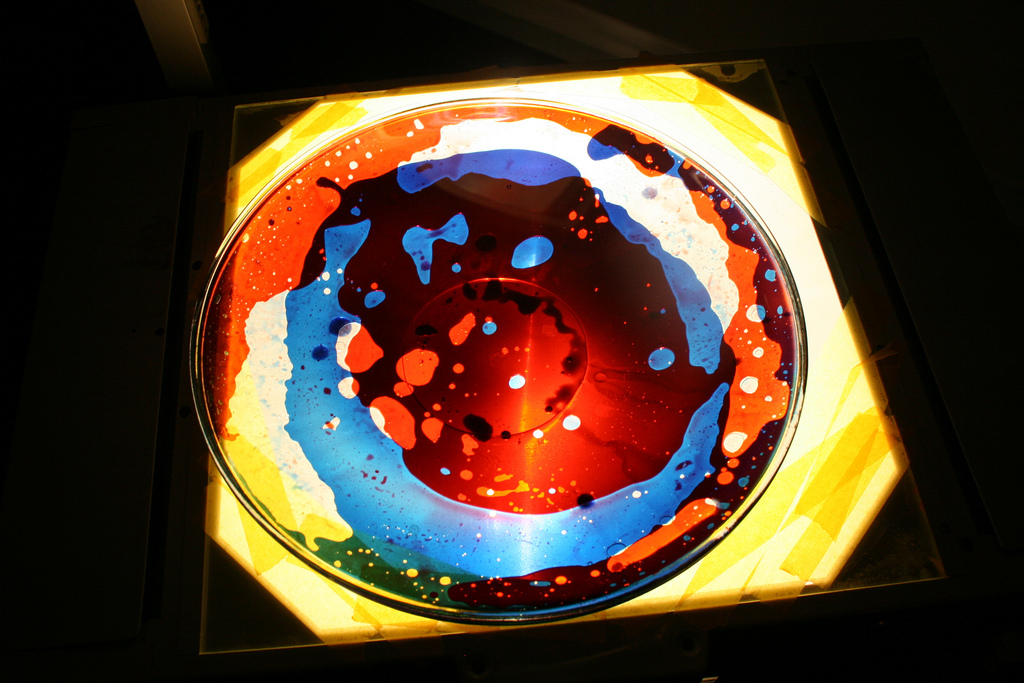
Psychedelic liquid light shows using powerful lamps have been used to project swirling colours onto screens since the 1960s

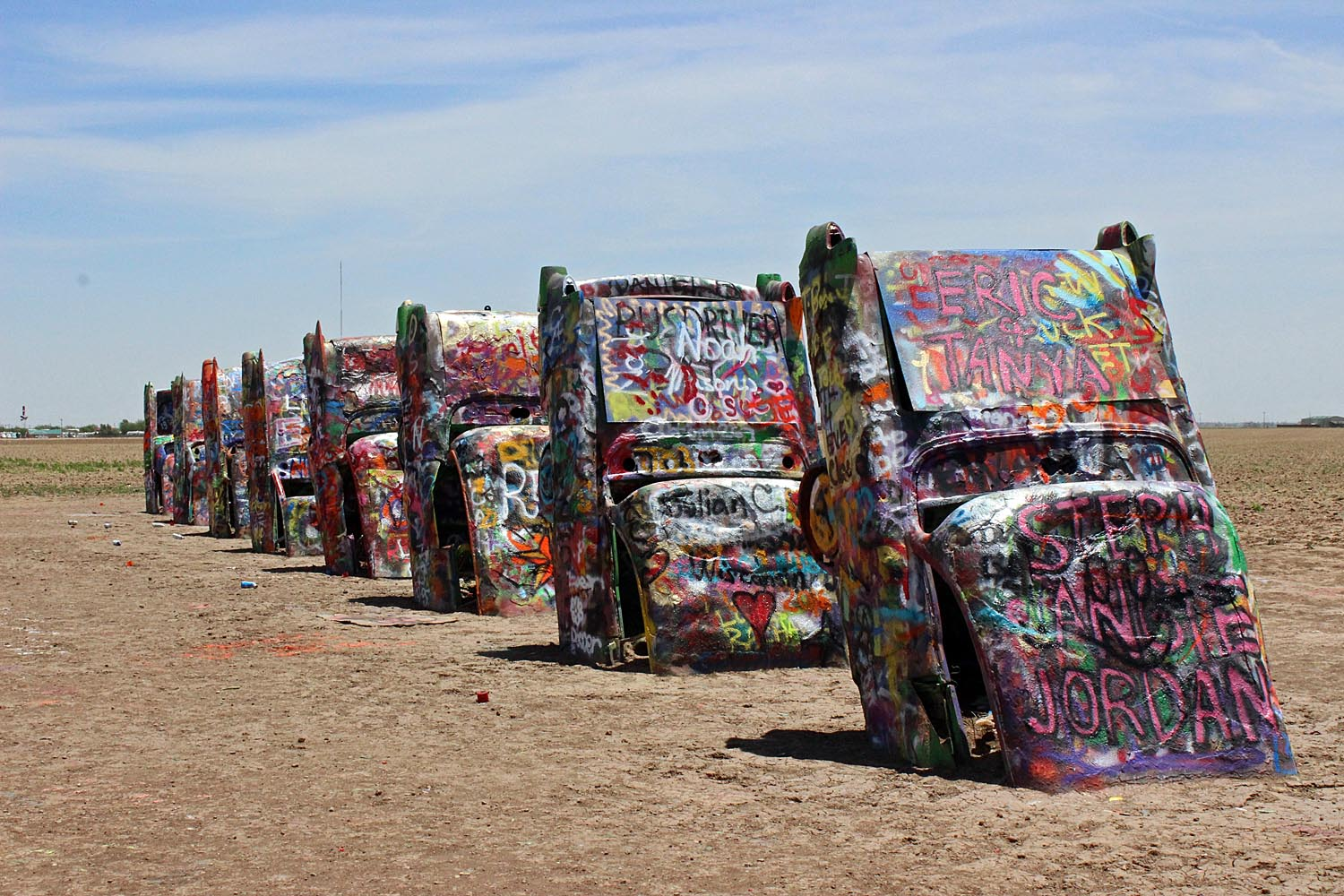
Cadillac Ranch, an example of psychedelic art

Psychedelia usually refers to a style or aesthetic that reflects the psychedelic subculture of the 1960s and psychedelic experience produced by certain psychoactive substances. This includes psychedelic art, psychedelic music and style of dress during that era. This was primarily generated by people who used psychedelic drugs such as LSD, mescaline (found in peyote) and psilocybin (found in magic mushrooms) and non-users who were participants and aficionados of this subculture. Psychedelic art and music typically recreate or reflect the experience of altered consciousness. Psychedelic art uses highly distorted, surreal visuals, bright colors and full spectrums and animation (including cartoons) to evoke, convey, or enhance the psychedelic experience.

Psychedelic music uses distorted electric guitar, Indian music elements such as the sitar and tabla, electronic effects, sound effects and reverb, and elaborate studio effects, such as playing tapes backwards or panning the music from one side to another.

Psychedelic states are an array of experiences including changes of perception such as hallucinations, synesthesia, altered states of awareness or focused consciousness, variation in thought patterns, trance or hypnotic states, mystical states, and other mind alterations.

These processes can lead some people to experience changes in mental operation defining their self-identity (whether in momentary acuity or chronic development) different enough from their previous normal state that it can excite feelings of newly formed understanding such as revelation, illumination, confusion, and psychosis. Individuals who use psychedelic drugs for spiritual purposes or self-discovery are commonly referred to as psychonauts.

== Etymology ==
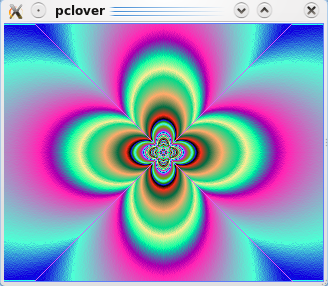
The smoking clover, a computer-generated image of psychedelic artwork

The term was first coined as a noun in 1956 by psychiatrist Humphry Osmond as an alternative descriptor for hallucinogenic drugs in the context of psychedelic psychotherapy. It is irregularly derived from the Greek words ψυχή psychḗ 'soul, mind' and δηλείν dēleín 'to manifest', with the meaning "mind manifesting," the implication being that psychedelics can develop unused potentials of the human mind. The term was loathed by American ethnobotanist Richard Schultes but championed by American psychologist Timothy Leary.

Seeking a name for the experience induced by LSD, Osmond contacted Aldous Huxley, a personal acquaintance and advocate for the therapeutic use of the substance. Huxley coined the term "phanerothyme," from the Greek terms for "manifest" (φανερός) and "spirit" (θύμος). In a letter to Osmond, he wrote:

To make this mundane world sublime,

Take half a gram of phanerothyme

To which Osmond responded:

To fathom Hell or soar angelic,
Just take a pinch of psychedelic

It was on this term that Osmond eventually settled, because it was "clear, euphonious and uncontaminated by other associations." This mongrel spelling of the word 'psychedelic' was loathed by American ethnobotanist Richard Evans Schultes, but championed by Timothy Leary, who thought it sounded better. Due to the expanded use of the term "psychedelic" in pop culture and a perceived incorrect verbal formulation, Carl A.P. Ruck, Jeremy Bigwood, Danny Staples, Jonathan Ott, and R. Gordon Wasson proposed the term "entheogen" to describe the religious or spiritual experience produced by such substances.

== History ==
From the second half of the 1950s, Beat Generation writers like William Burroughs, Jack Kerouac and Allen Ginsberg wrote about and took drugs, including cannabis and Benzedrine, raising awareness and helping to popularise their use. In the same period Lysergic acid diethylamide, better known as LSD, or "acid" (at the time a legal drug), began to be used in the US and UK as an experimental treatment, initially promoted as a potential cure for mental illness.

In the early 1960s, the use of LSD and other hallucinogens was advocated by proponents of the new "consciousness expansion", such as Timothy Leary, Alan Watts, Aldous Huxley and Arthur Koestler, their writings profoundly influenced the thinking of the new generation of youth. There had long been a culture of drug use among jazz and blues musicians, and use of drugs (including cannabis, peyote, mescaline and LSD) had begun to grow among folk and rock musicians, who also began to include drug references in their songs. (Note: New York folk musician Peter Stampfel claimed to be the first to use the word "psychedelic" in a song lyric (The Holy Modal Rounders' version of "Hesitation Blues", 1963).) In the UK rock scene, some notable users were groups such as the Rolling Stones, the Beatles and the Moody Blues.

By the mid-1960s, the psychedelic life-style had already developed in California, and an entire subculture developed. This was particularly true in San Francisco, due in part to the first major underground LSD factory, established there by Owsley Stanley. There was also an emerging music scene of folk clubs, coffee houses and independent radio stations catering to a population of students at nearby Berkeley, and to free thinkers that had gravitated to the city.

From 1964, the Merry Pranksters, a loose group that developed around novelist Ken Kesey, sponsored the Acid Tests, a series of events based around the taking of LSD (supplied by Stanley), accompanied by light shows, film projection and discordant, improvised music known as the psychedelic symphony. The Pranksters helped popularize LSD use through their road trips across America in a psychedelically decorated school bus, which involved distributing the drug and meeting with major figures of the beat movement, and through publications about their activities such as Tom Wolfe's The Electric Kool-Aid Acid Test (1968).

Leary was a well-known proponent of the use of psychedelics, as was Aldous Huxley. However, both advanced widely different opinions on the broad use of psychedelics by state and civil society. Leary promulgated the idea of such substances as a panacea, while Huxley suggested that only the cultural and intellectual elite should partake of entheogens systematically.

In the 1960s, the use of psychedelic drugs became widespread in modern Western culture, particularly in the United States and Britain. The movement is credited to Michael Hollingshead who arrived in America from London in 1965. He was sent to the U.S. by other members of the psychedelic movement to get their ideas exposure. The Summer of Love of 1967 and the resultant popularization of the hippie culture to the mainstream popularized psychedelia in the minds of popular culture, where it remained dominant through the 1970s.

== Modern usage ==
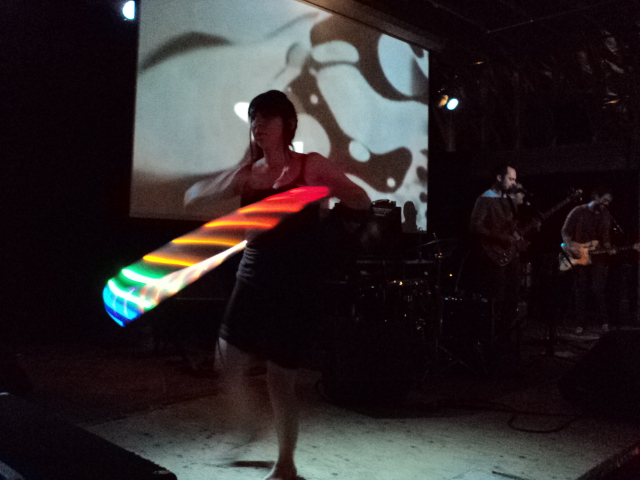
A retro example of psychedelia; the dancer combines 1960s fashion with modern LED lighting.

The impact of psychedelic drugs on western culture in the 1960s led to semantic drift in the use of the word "psychedelic", and it is now frequently used to describe anything with abstract decoration of multiple bright colours, similar to those seen in drug-induced hallucinations. In objection to this new meaning, and to what some consider pejorative meanings of other synonyms such as "hallucinogen" and "psychotomimetic", the term "entheogen" was proposed and is seeing increasing use. However, some consider the term "entheogen" best reserved for religious and spiritual usage, such as certain Native American churches do with the peyote sacrament, and "psychedelic" left to describe those who are using these drugs for recreation, psychotherapy, physical healing, or creative problem solving. In science, hallucinogen remains the standard term.

== Visual art ==
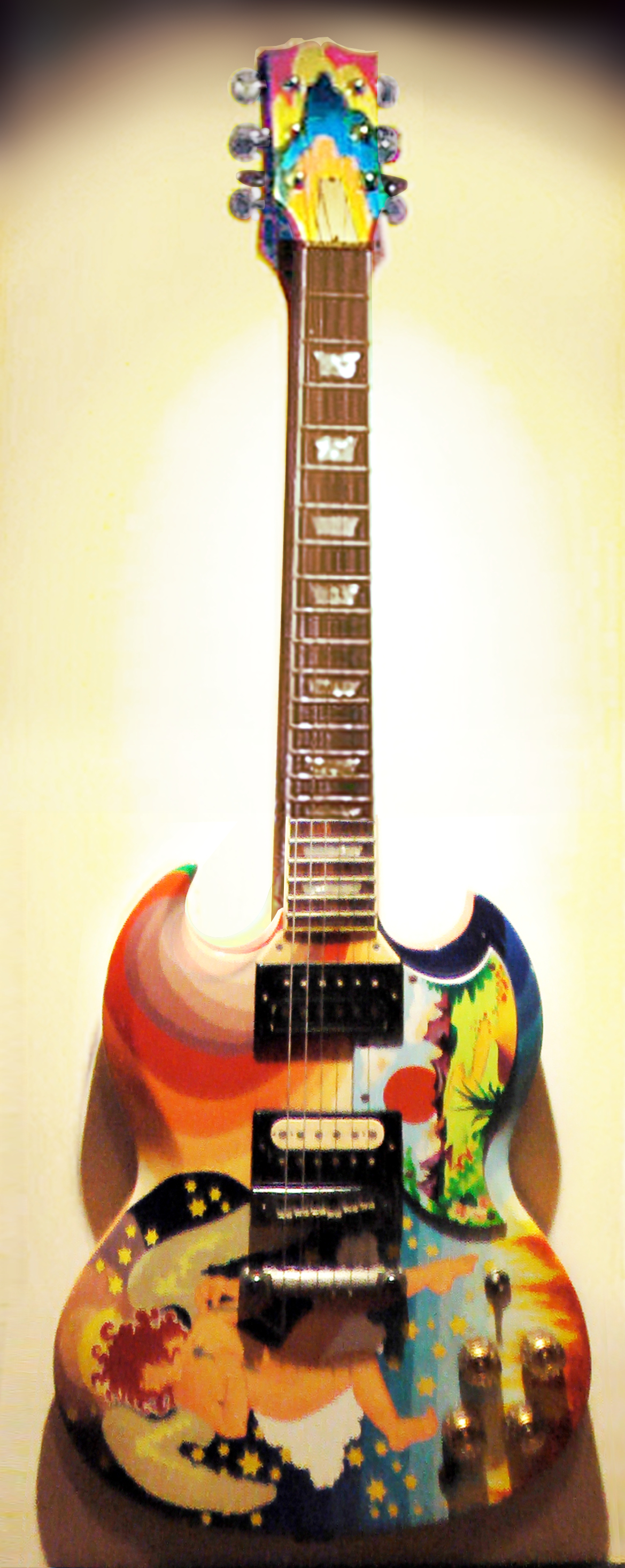
Replica of Eric Clapton's "The Fool", a guitar design which became symbolic of the psychedelic era

Advances in printing and photographic technology in the 1960s saw the traditional lithography printing techniques rapidly superseded by the offset printing system. This and other technical and industrial innovations gave young artists access to exciting new graphic techniques and media, including photographic and mixed media collage, metallic foils, and vivid new fluorescent "DayGlo" inks. This enabled them to explore innovative new illustrative styles including highly distorted visuals, cartoons, and lurid colors and full spectrums to evoke a sense of altered consciousness; a number of works also featured idiosyncratic and complex new fonts and lettering styles (most notably in the work of San Francisco-based poster artist Rick Griffin). A number of artists in the late 1960s and early 1970s attempted to illustrate the psychedelic experience in paintings, drawings, illustrations, and other forms of graphic design.

The counterculture music scene frequently used psychedelic designs on posters during the Summer of Love, leading to a popularization of the style. The most productive and influential centre of psychedelic art in the late 1960s was San Francisco; a scene driven in large measure by the patronage of the popular local music venues of the day like the Avalon Ballroom and Bill Graham's Fillmore West, which regularly commissioned young local artists like Robert Crumb, Stanley Mouse, Rick Griffin and others. They produced a wealth of distinctive psychedelic promotional posters and handbills for concerts that featured emerging psychedelic bands like Big Brother and the Holding Company, The Grateful Dead and Jefferson Airplane. A number of these works are now regarded as classics of the poster genre, and original items by these artists command high prices on the collector market today.

Contemporary with the burgeoning San Francisco scene, a smaller but equally creative psychedelic art movement emerged in London, led by expatriate Australian pop artist Martin Sharp, who created multiple psychedelic posters and illustrations for the influential underground publication Oz magazine, as well as the famous album covers for the Cream albums Disraeli Gears and Wheels of Fire.

Other prominent London practitioners of the style included: design duo Hapshash and the Coloured Coat, whose work included multiple famous posters, as well as psychedelic "makeovers" on a piano for Paul McCartney and a car for doomed Guinness heir Tara Browne, and design collective The Fool, who created clothes and album art for several leading UK bands including The Beatles, Cream, and The Move. The Beatles loved psychedelic designs on their albums, and designer group called The Fool created psychedelic design, art, paint at the short-lived Apple Boutique (1967–1968) in Baker St, London.

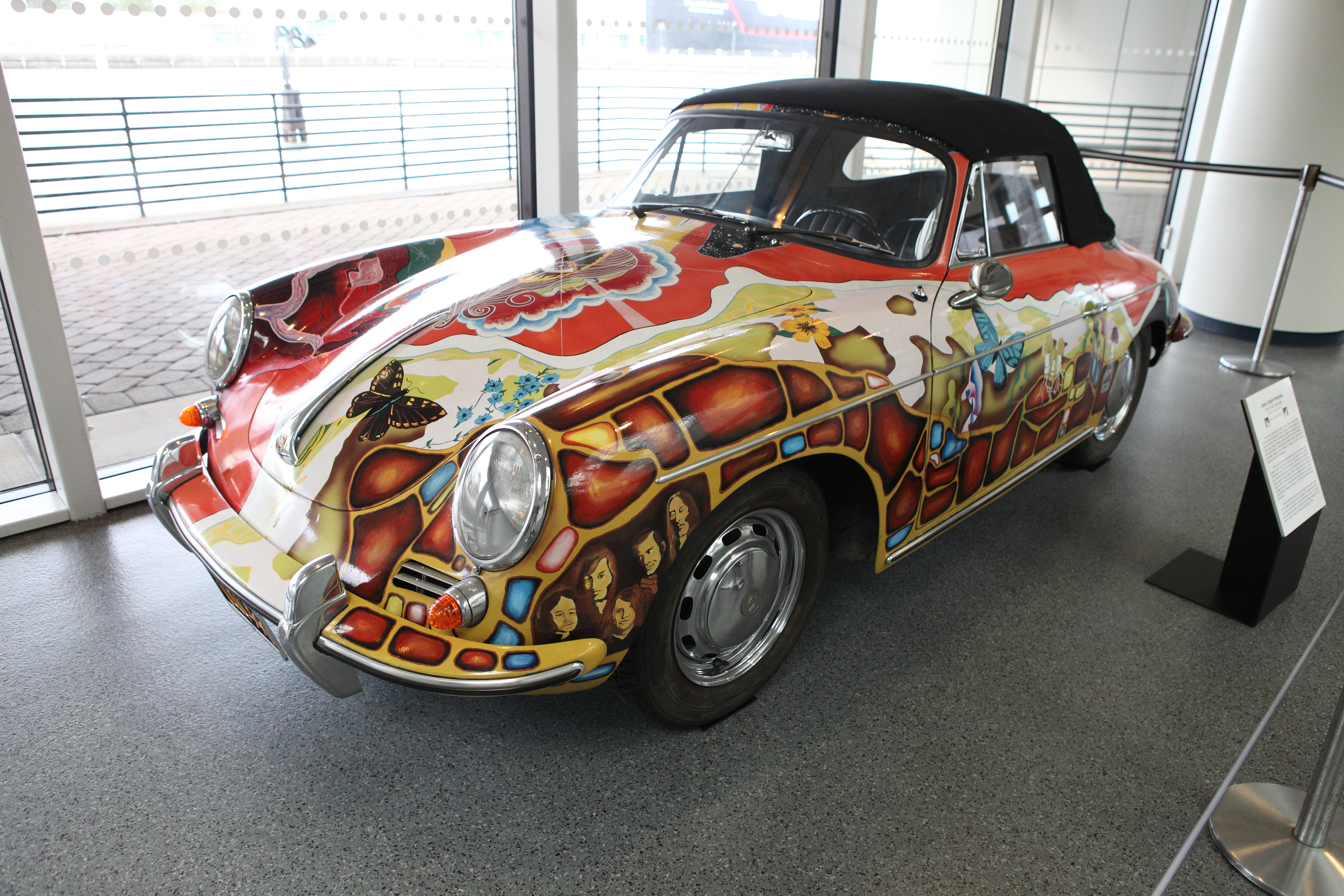
Joplin's Porsche 356C in "Summer of Love – Art of the Psychedelic Era" at the Whitney Museum in New York City

Blues rock singer Janis Joplin had a psychedelic car, a Porsche 356. The trend also extended to motor vehicles. The earliest, and perhaps most famous of all psychedelic vehicles was the famous "Further" bus, driven by Ken Kesey and The Merry Pranksters, which was painted inside and out in 1964 with bold psychedelic designs (although these were executed in primary colours, since the DayGlo colours that soon became de rigueur were then not widely available). Another famous example is John Lennon's psychedelic Rolls-Royce – originally black, he had it repainted in 1967 in a vivid psychedelic gypsy caravan style, prompting bandmate George Harrison to have his Mini Cooper similarly repainted with logos and devices that reflected his burgeoning interest in Indian spirituality.

== Psychedelia design ==
The Psychedelia movement in the 1960s had a large impact on graphic design and architecture during the movement. During this time period, it was all about taking creative risks. This movement was experimental and colorful. There was a political unrest because of Black and Indigenous groups trying to get their rights. With African Americans, it was the civil rights movement. Michael Parke-Taylor includes Native Americans in the conversation. For Indigenous or Native Americans, they "represented the perfect symbol of those marginalized and persecuted in contemporary American society."

Graphic design during this era was playful and colorful. This was because of the drug known as LSD. The Hippies took over the psychedelic designs. Jeffrey Meikle understood what the Hippies wanted to create. He knew that the "Hippie artists energized American visual culture with rock concert posters, record jackets, extravagant, and underground newspapers." Milton Glaser has a poster design of Bob Dylan. The poster is colorful and playful. Glaser wanted to get away from the black and white designs of posters and trade that in for a more experimental design. These designs were usually hand painted and printed. The typography was the same as the poster which was playful and colorful. Juliana Duque mentions the typography was "organic patterns, kaleidoscopic textures, and waving (nearly encrypted) lettering combined with intense colors."

There were a few architecture designs that came out during this period. The graphic design elements on buses were just as colorful as the posters. They employed psychedelic elements to craft immersive environments and foster an interactive space. Luke Dickens explores the overlooked architecture in the 1960s. He mentions The Fifth Dimension as being "highly inventive, utopian 'fun palace' used advanced modular technologies ... and deployed psychedelic sensibilities as a novel form of disruptive politics to induce critical dispositions towards the built environment." The theme of bright colors was evident in this fiber glass domed-shaped building. This building was meant to trigger psychedelic responses. Similar to the Fifth Dimension, there was a geodesic dome and a dymaxion car made by Buckminster Fuller. The geodesic dome was complex. Meikle explained that Fuller followed the psychedelia era by wanting to speak "to a counterculture claiming to reject American Materialism."

== Music ==
The fashion for psychedelic drugs gave its name to the style of psychedelia, a term describing a category of rock music known as psychedelic rock, as well as visual art, fashion, and culture that is associated originally with the high 1960s, hippies, and the Haight-Ashbury neighborhood of San Francisco, California. It often used new recording techniques and effects while drawing on Eastern sources such as the ragas and drones of Indian music.

One of the first uses of the word in the music scene of this time was in the 1964 recording of "Hesitation Blues" by folk group the Holy Modal Rounders. The term was introduced to rock music and popularized by the 13th Floor Elevators 1966 album The Psychedelic Sounds of the 13th Floor Elevators. Psychedelia truly took off in 1967 with the Summer of Love and, although associated with San Francisco, the style soon spread across the US, and worldwide.

The electronic dance music scene is strongly linked to the consumption of psychedelic drugs, particularly MDMA. Drug usage in the EDM scene can primarily be traced to British acid house parties and the Second Summer of Love, which marked the beginnings of rave culture; these movements, however, were distinct from and mostly unrelated to 1960s psychedelia.

== Festivals ==
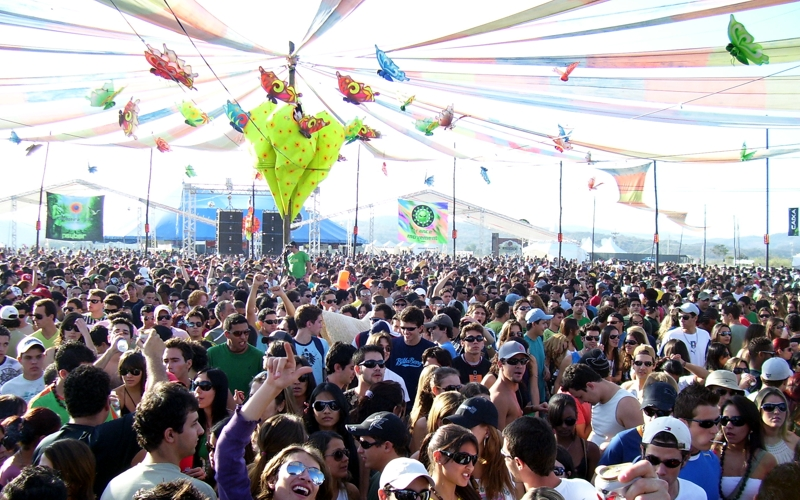
Psychedelic Festival in Brazil

A psychedelic festival is a gathering that promotes psychedelic music and art in an effort to unite participants in a communal psychedelic experience. Psychedelic festivals have been described as "temporary communities reproduced via personal and collective acts of transgression ... through the routine expenditure of excess energy, and through self-sacrifice in acts of abandonment involving ecstatic dancing often fueled by chemical cocktails." These festivals often emphasize the ideals of peace, love, unity, and respect. Notable psychedelic festivals include the biennial Boom Festival in Portugal, Ozora Festival in Hungary, Universo Paralello in Brazil as well as Nevada's Burning Man and California's Symbiosis Gathering in the United States.

== Conferences ==
In recent years there has been a resurgence in interest in psychedelic research and a growing number of conferences now take place across the globe. The psychedelic research charity Breaking Convention have hosted one of the world's largest since 2011. A biennial conference in London, UK, Breaking Convention: a multidisciplinary conference on psychedelic consciousness is a multidisciplinary conference on psychedelic consciousness. In the US MAPS held their first Psychedelic Science conference, devoted specifically to research of psychedelics in scientific and medical fields, in 2013. In Australia, Entheogenesis Australis has been hosting the world's longest ongoing conferences around psychedelics and ethnobotany since 2004.

== See also ==
- Counterculture of the 1960s
- The Doors of Perception
- Ego death
- Erowid
- God in a Pill?
- Psychedelic era
- Psychedelia – Film about the history of psychedelic drugs
- Psychedelic fish
- Psychedelic literature
- Psychedelic plants
- Psychedelicism
- Psychonautics
- Serotonergic psychedelic
- Timeline of 1960s counterculture
- Trip killer
- Trip report
- Bicycle day
