= Ambrosia =

Mythical food of the Greek gods

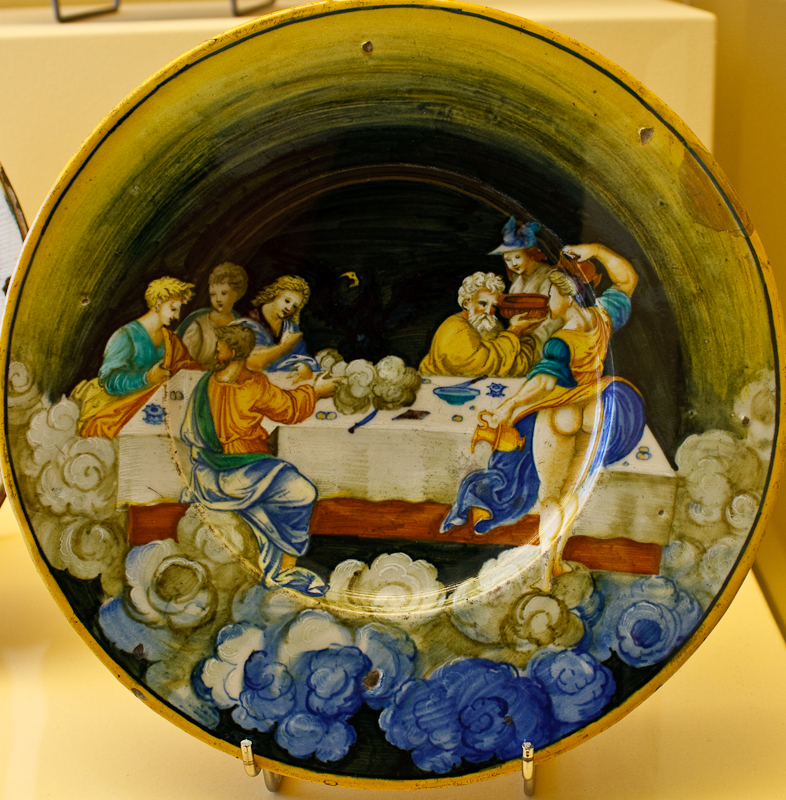
The Food of the Gods on Olympus (1530), majolica dish attributed to Nicola da Urbino

In the ancient Greek myths, ambrosia (/æmˈbroʊziə, -ʒə/, Ancient Greek: ἀμβροσία 'immortality') is the food or drink of the Greek gods, and is often depicted as conferring longevity or immortality upon whoever consumed it. It was brought to the gods in Olympus by doves and served either by Hebe or by Ganymede at the heavenly feast.

Ancient art sometimes depicted ambrosia as distributed by the nymph named Ambrosia, a nurse of Dionysus.

== Definition ==
Ambrosia is very closely related to nectar, the Greek gods' other form of sustenance. The two terms may not have originally been distinguished from each other. For example, in Homer's poems nectar is usually the drink and ambrosia the food of the gods; it was with ambrosia that Hera "cleansed all defilement from her lovely flesh", and with ambrosia that Athena prepared Penelope in her sleep so that when she appeared for the final time before her suitors, the effects of years had been stripped away and the sight of her inflamed them with passion. On the other hand, in Alcman, nectar is the food, and in Sappho and Anaxandrides, ambrosia is the drink. A character in Aristophanes' Knights says, "I dreamed the goddess poured ambrosia over your head—out of a ladle." Both descriptions could be correct, as ambrosia could be a liquid considered a food (such as honey).

The consumption of ambrosia was typically reserved for divine beings. Upon his assumption into immortality on Olympus, Heracles is given ambrosia by Athena, while the hero Tydeus is denied the same thing when the goddess discovers him eating human brains. In one version of the myth of Tantalus, part of Tantalus' crime is that after tasting ambrosia himself, he attempts to steal some to give to other mortals. Those who consume ambrosia typically have ichor, not blood, in their veins.

Both nectar and ambrosia are fragrant, and may be used as perfume: in the Odyssey Menelaus and his men are disguised as seals in untanned seal skins, "and the deadly smell of the seal skins vexed us sore; but the goddess saved us; she brought ambrosia and put it under our nostrils." Homer speaks of ambrosial raiment, ambrosial locks of hair, even the gods' ambrosial sandals.

Among later writers, ambrosia has been so often used with generic meanings of "delightful liquid" that such late writers as Athenaeus, Paulus and Dioscurides employ it as a technical term in contexts of cookery, medicine, and botany. Pliny used the term in connection with different plants, as did early herbalists.

Additionally, some modern ethnomycologists, such as Danny Staples, identify ambrosia with the hallucinogenic mushroom Amanita muscaria: "it was the food of the gods, their ambrosia, and nectar was the pressed sap of its juices", Staples asserts.

W. H. Roscher thinks that both nectar and ambrosia were kinds of honey, in which case their power of conferring immortality would be due to the supposed healing and cleansing powers of honey, and because fermented honey (mead) preceded wine as an entheogen in the Aegean world; on some Minoan seals, goddesses were represented with bee faces (compare Merope and Melissa).

== Etymology ==
The concept of an immortality drink is attested in at least two ancient Indo-European languages: Greek and Sanskrit. The Greek ἀμβροσία (ambrosia) is semantically linked to the Sanskrit अमृत (IAST: amṛta) as both words denote a drink or food that gods use to achieve immortality. The two words appear to be derived from the same Indo-European form *ṇ-mṛ-tós, "un-dying" (n-: negative prefix from which the prefix a- in both Greek and Sanskrit are derived; mṛ: zero grade of *mer-, "to die"; and -to-: adjectival suffix). A semantically similar etymology exists for nectar, the beverage of the gods (Greek: νέκταρ néktar) presumed to be a compound of the PIE roots *nek-, "death", and -*tar, "overcoming".

== Other examples in mythology ==
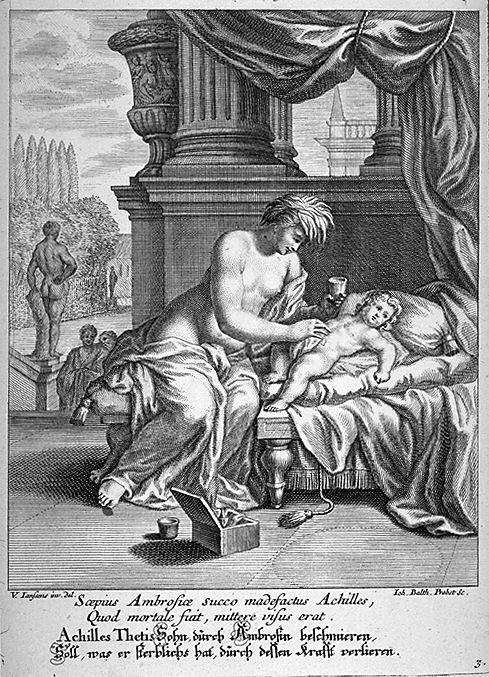
Thetis anoints Achilles with ambrosia, by Johann Balthasar Probst (1673–1748)

- In one version of the story of the birth of Achilles, Thetis anoints the infant with ambrosia and passes the child through the fire to make him immortal but Peleus, appalled, stops her, leaving only his heel unimmortalised (Argonautica 4.869–879).
- In the Iliad xvi, Apollo washes the black blood from the corpse of Sarpedon and anoints it with ambrosia, readying it for its dreamlike return to Sarpedon's native Lycia. Similarly, Thetis anoints the corpse of Patroclus in order to preserve it. Ambrosia and nectar are depicted as unguents (xiv. 170; xix. 38).
- In the Odyssey, Calypso is described as having "spread a table with ambrosia and set it by Hermes, and mixed the rosy-red nectar." It is ambiguous whether he means the ambrosia itself is rosy-red, or if he is describing a rosy-red nectar Hermes drinks along with the ambrosia. Later, Circe mentions to Odysseus that a flock of doves are the bringers of ambrosia to Olympus.
- In the Odyssey (ix.345–359), Polyphemus likens the wine given to him by Odysseus to ambrosia and nectar.
- One of the impieties of Tantalus, according to Pindar, was that he offered to his guests the ambrosia of the Deathless Ones, a theft akin to that of Prometheus, Karl Kerenyi noted (in Heroes of the Greeks).
- In the Homeric hymn to Aphrodite, the goddess uses "ambrosial bridal oil that she had ready perfumed."
- In the story of Eros and Psyche as told by Apuleius, Psyche is given ambrosia upon her completion of the quests set by Aphrodite and her acceptance on Olympus. After she partakes, she and Eros are wed as gods.
- In the Aeneid, Aeneas encounters his mother in an alternate, or illusory form. When she became her godly form "Her hair's ambrosia breathed a holy fragrance."

== Ambrosia (nymph) ==
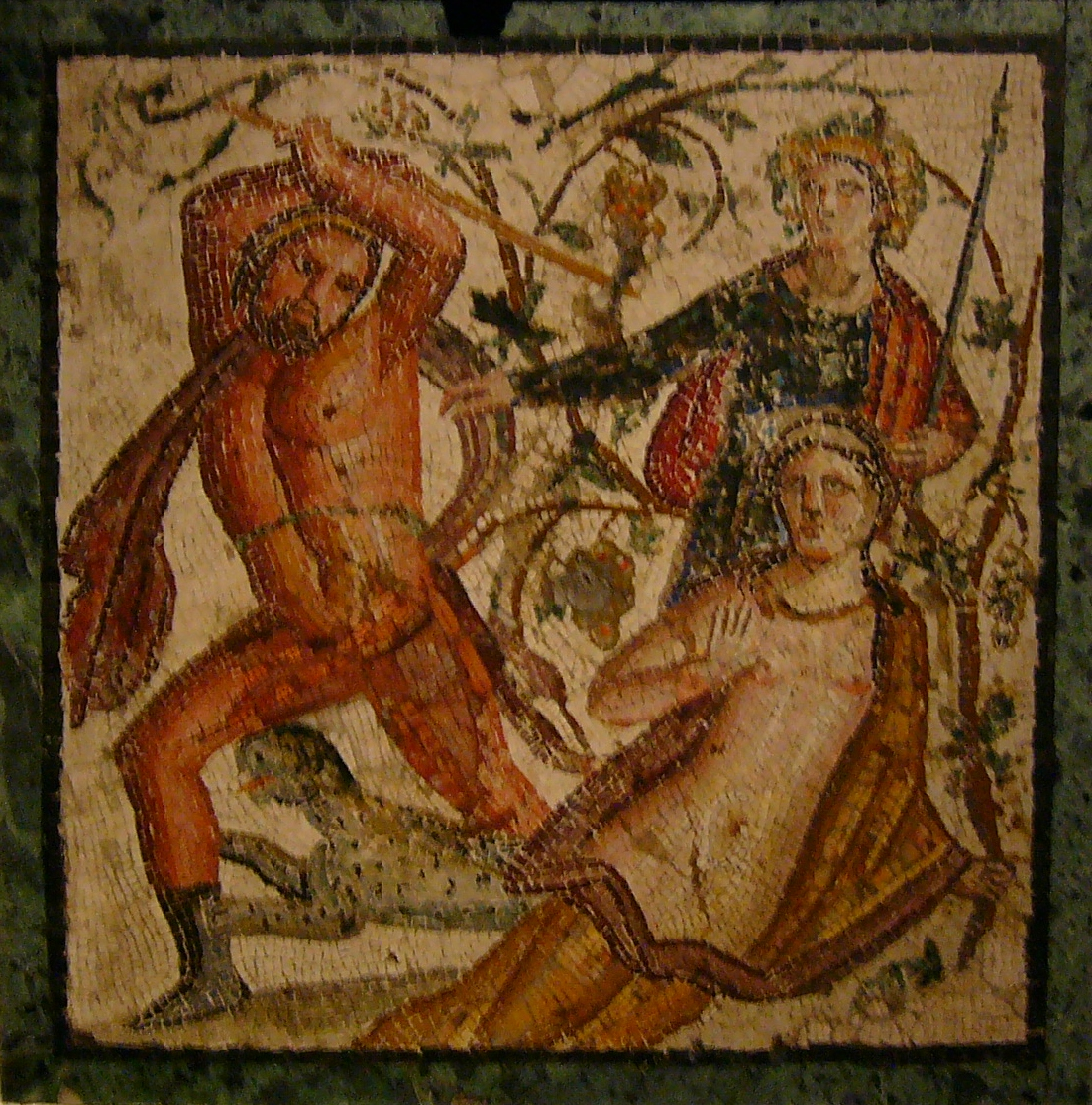
Lycurgus attacking the nymph Ambrosia (mosaic from Herculaneum, 45–79 AD)

Lycurgus, king of Thrace, forbade the cult of Dionysus, whom he drove from Thrace, and attacked the gods' entourage when they celebrated the god. Among them was Ambrosia, who turned herself into a grapevine to hide from his wrath. Dionysus, enraged by the king's actions, drove him mad. In his fit of insanity he killed his son, whom he mistook for a stock of ivy, and then himself.

== See also ==
- Amrita
- Elixir of life, a potion sought by alchemy to produce immortality
- Ichor, blood of the Greek gods, related to ambrosia
- Iðunn's apples in Norse mythology
- Manna, food given by God to the Israelites
- Peaches of Immortality in Chinese mythology
- Pill of Immortality
- Silphium
- Soma and Haoma, a ritual drink of importance among the early Vedic peoples and Indo-Iranians.

== Sources ==
- Clay, Jenny Strauss, "Immortal and ageless forever", The Classical Journal 77.2 (December 1981:pp. 112–117).
- Ruck, Carl A.P. and Danny Staples, The World of Classical Myth 1994, p. 26 et seq.
- Wright, F. A., "The Food of the Gods", The Classical Review 31.1, (February 1917:4–6).
