= Entheogenic drugs and the archaeological record =

Archaeological records of drugs used in a ritual context

Entheogenic drugs have been used by various cultural groups for thousands of years, traditionally in a religious, shamanic, or spiritual context.

== Common era ==
A Finnish study assayed psilocybin concentrations in old herbarium specimens, and concluded that although psilocybin concentration decreased linearly over time, it was relatively stable. They were able to detect the chemical in specimens that were 115 years old.

== New World ==
The Maya, Olmecs, and Aztecs have well-documented entheogenic complexes. North American cultures also have a tradition of entheogens. In South America, especially in Peru, the archaeological study of cultures like Chavin, Cupisnique, Nazca and Moche, have demonstrated the use of entheogens through archaeobotanical, iconographic and paraphernalia.

=== Olmec ===
The Olmec (1200 BCE to 400 BCE) lived in Central America and are largely viewed by many as the mother culture of Aztecs and Maya. The Olmecs left no written works on their belief structures, so many interpretations on Olmec beliefs are largely based on interpretations of murals and artifacts. Archaeologists state three reasons for believing that the Olmecs used entheogens:

1. Burials of bufo toads with priests
2. The use of entheogens in later Olmec-inspired cultures
3. Sculptures of shamans and other figures have strong therianthropic imagery.

=== Maya ===
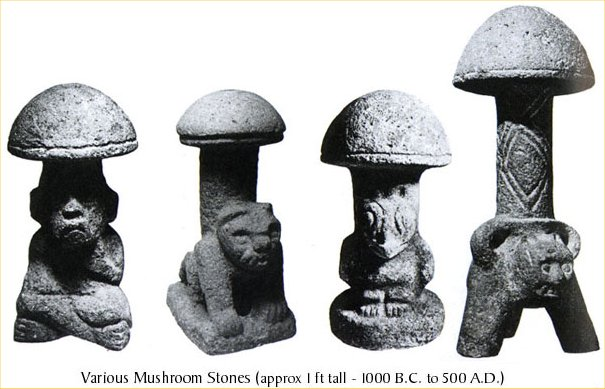
Maya 'mushroom stones' - conjectured to relate to a psilocybin mushroom cult

The Maya (250 BCE to 900 CE) flourished in Central America and were prevalent even until the arrival of the Spanish. The Maya religious tradition was complex and well-developed. Unlike the Olmec, the Maya possessed religious texts that have survived to this day. The Maya religion displayed characteristic Mesoamerican mythology, with a strong emphasis on an individual being a communicator between the physical world and the spiritual world. Mushroom stone effigies, dated to 1000 BCE, give evidence that mushrooms were at least revered in a religious way.

The late Maya archaeologist, Dr Stephan F. de Borhegyi, published the first of several articles in which he proposed the existence of a Mesoamerican mushroom cult in the Guatemalan highlands as early as 1000 BCE. This cult, which was associated from its beginnings with ritual human decapitation, a trophy head cult, warfare and the Mesoamerican ballgame, appears to have had its origins along the Pacific coastal piedmont. Borhegyi developed this proposition after finding a significant number of small, mushroom-shaped sculptures in the collections of the Guatemala National Museum and in numerous private collections in and around Guatemala City. While the majority of these small stone sculptures were of indeterminate provenance, a sufficient number had been found during the course of archaeological investigations as to permit him to determine approximate dates and to catalog them stylistically (Borhegyi de, S.F., 1957b, "Mushroom Stones of Middle America," in Mushrooms, Russia and History by Valentina P. Wasson and R. Gordon Wasson, eds. N.T.)

Archaeologist Stephan F. de Borhegyi wrote:

"My assignment for the so-called mushroom cult, earliest 1,000 B.C., is based on the excavations of Kidder and Shook at the Verbena cemetery at Kaminaljuyu. The mushroom stone found in this Pre-Classic grave, discovered in Mound E-III-3, has a circular groove on the cap. There are also a number of yet unpublished mushroom stone specimens in the Guatemalan Museum from Highland Guatemala where the pottery association would indicate that they are Pre-Classic. In each case the mushroom stone fragments have a circular groove on the top. Mushroom stones found during the Classic and Post-Classic periods do not have circular grooves. This was the basis on which I prepared the chart on mushroom stones which was then subsequently published by the Wassons. Based on Carbon 14 dates and stratigraphy, some of these Pre-Classic finds can be dated as early as 1,000 B.C. The reference is in the following".....(see Shook, E.M. & Kidder, A.V., 1952. Mound E-III-3, Kaminaljuyu, Guatemala; Contributions to American Anthropology & History No. 53 from Publ. 596, Carnegie Institution of Washington, D.C. (letter from de Borhegyi to Dr. Robert Ravicz, MPM archives December 1st 1960)

The most direct evidence of Maya entheogen use comes from modern descendants of the Maya who use entheogenic drugs today.

=== Aztec ===
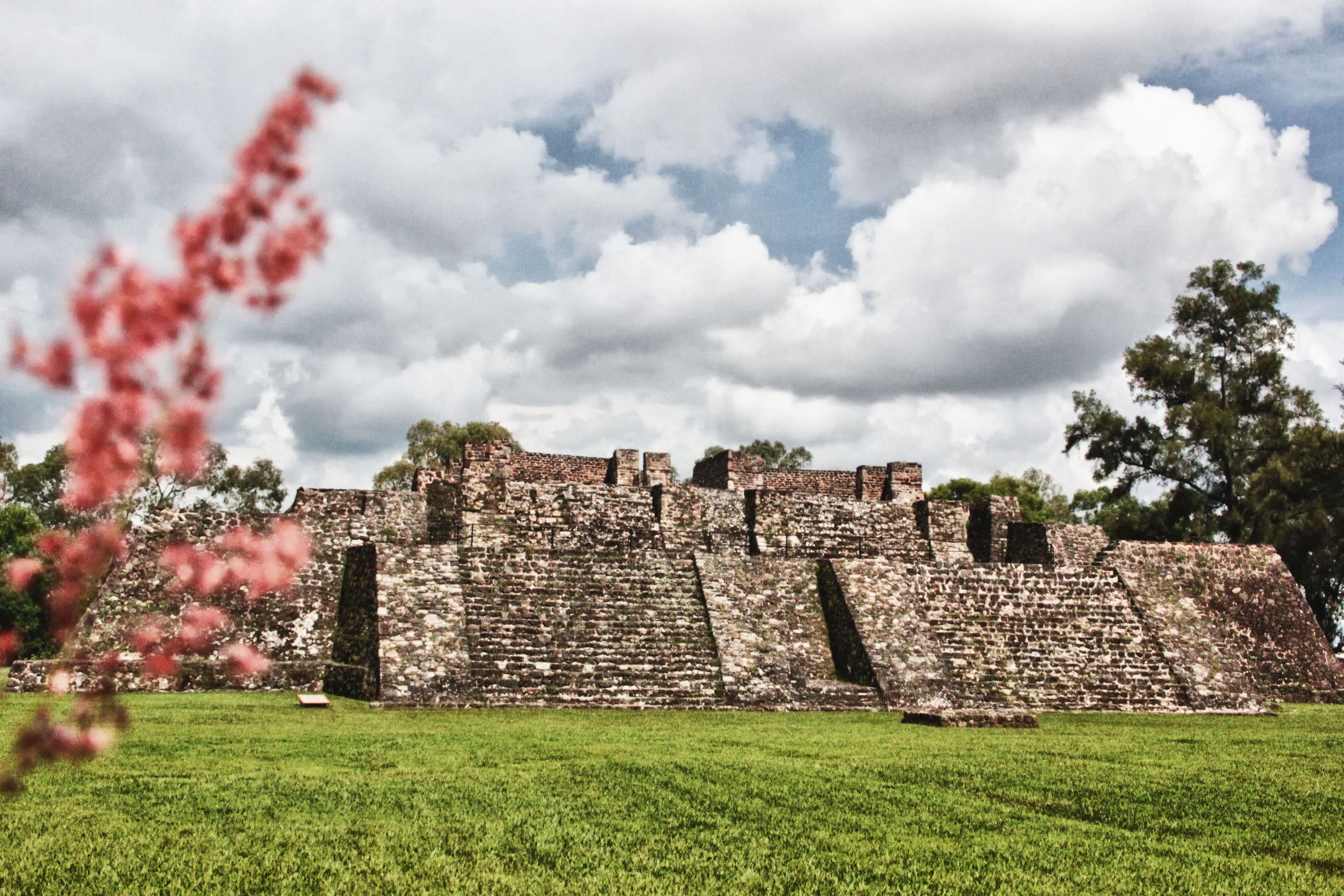
Pyramid of Teopanzolco, Cuernavaca, Morelos.

The Aztec entheogenic complex is extremely well documented. Through historical evidence, there is proof that the Aztecs used several forms of psychoactive drugs. These drugs include Ololiuqui (the seed of Rivea corymbosa), Teonanácatl (translated as "mushroom of the gods", a psilocybe mushroom) and sinicuichi (a flower added to drinks). The Xochipilli statue, according to R.G. Wasson, gives the identity of several entheogenic plants. Other evidence for entheogenic use of the Aztecs comes from the Florentine Codex, a series of 12 books vividly describing the Aztec culture and society, including the use of entheogenic drugs.

=== Native Americans of the Southwestern United States ===
There are several contemporary indigenous groups who use entheogens, in both North and South America.

=== Native Americans of the Southeastern United States ===
Archeological evidence seems to indicate that some Indigenous peoples of the Southeastern Woodlands, specifically those of the Mississippian culture, used Datura stramonium as a hallucinogen.

== Old World ==
=== Egypt ===
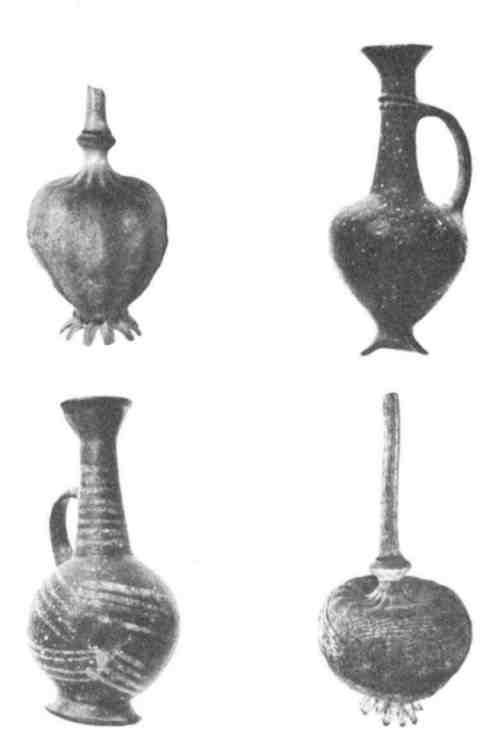
Two small opium juglets that came to Egypt from Cyprus around 1600 B.C. - 1500 B.C.

In Egypt, the use of opium was generally restricted to priests, magicians, and warriors, its invention is credited to Thoth, and it was said to have been given by Isis to Ra as treatment for a headache. A figure of the Minoan "goddess of the narcotics", wearing a crown of three opium poppies, BCE, was recovered from the Sanctuary of Gazi, Crete, together with a simple smoking apparatus.

=== Paleolithic ===
During the Paleolithic, there is ample evidence of drug use as seen by preserved botanical remains and coprolites. Some scholars had suggested that the "Flower Burial" in Shanidar Cave, a Paleolithic site in Iraq, was evidence of a shamanic death ritual, but more recent evidence and analysis has contradicted that claim. The most direct evidence we have from the Paleolithic in terms of art comes from Tassili, Algeria cave paintings depicting Psilocybe mairei mushrooms dated 7000 to 9000 years before present. From this region, there are several therianthropic images portraying the painter and the animals around him as one (an often cited effect of many psychedelic drugs, Ego death or unity). One image, in particular, shows a man who has formed into one common form with a mushroom.

=== Mesolithic ===
A cave painting in Spain has been interpreted as depicting Psilocybe hispanica.

== See also ==
- List of substances used in rituals
- Ancient use of cannabis
- Cannabis and religion
- History of entheogenic drugs
- Stela of the cactus bearer
- The Encyclopedia of Psychoactive Plants

== Bibliography ==
- Bierhorst, John (1990). The Mythology of Mexico and Central America. William Morrow & Company, New York. ISBN 9780688067212
- Demarest, Arthur (2004). Ancient Maya: The Rise and Fall of the Rainforest Civilization. Cambridge: Cambridge University Press.
- Dibble, Charles E., et al. (trans). "Florentine Codex: Book 11 - Earthly Things". The School of American Research. Santa Fe, New Mexico, 1963.
- Furst, Peter T. (1972) Flesh of the Gods: The Ritual Use of Hallucinogens (with contributions from Wasson and others). Praeger Publishers, Westport. ASIN B000P5B2YI
- Hofmann, Albert. "Teonanácatl and Ololiuqui, two ancient magic drugs of Mexico". In UNODC Bulletin on Narcotics, Issue 1, pp. 3–14, 1971.
- McKenna, Terence. Food of the Gods. (New York, HarperCollins) p. 84.
- Wasson, Robert Gordon, Stella Kramrisch, Jonathan Ott and Carl A. P. Ruck. (1986). Persephone's Quest: Entheogens and the Origins of Religion. ISBN 0-300-05266-9
- Roberts, T. B. (editor) (2001). Psychoactive Sacramentals: Essays on Entheogens and Religion. San Francisco: Council on Spiritual Practices.
- Roberts, T. B., and Hruby, P. J. (1995–2002). Religion and Psychoactive Sacraments An Entheogen Chrestomathy. Online archive. Council on Spiritual Practices
- Roberts, T. B. "Chemical Input—Religious Output: Entheogens." Chapter 10 in Where God and Science Meet: Vol. 3: The Psychology of Religious Experience Robert McNamara (editor)(2006). Westport, Connecticut: Praeger/Greenwood.
- Sharon, Douglas (2000). Shamanism & the Sacred Cactus: Ethnoarchaeological Evidence for San Pedro Use in Northern Peru. San Diego Museum of Man.
- Torres, Constantino Manuel & David B. Repke (2006). Anadenanthera: Visionary Plant of Ancient South America. Haworth Press, New York. ISBN 978-0-7890-2641-5
