= Ethnomycology =

Study of the human use of fungi

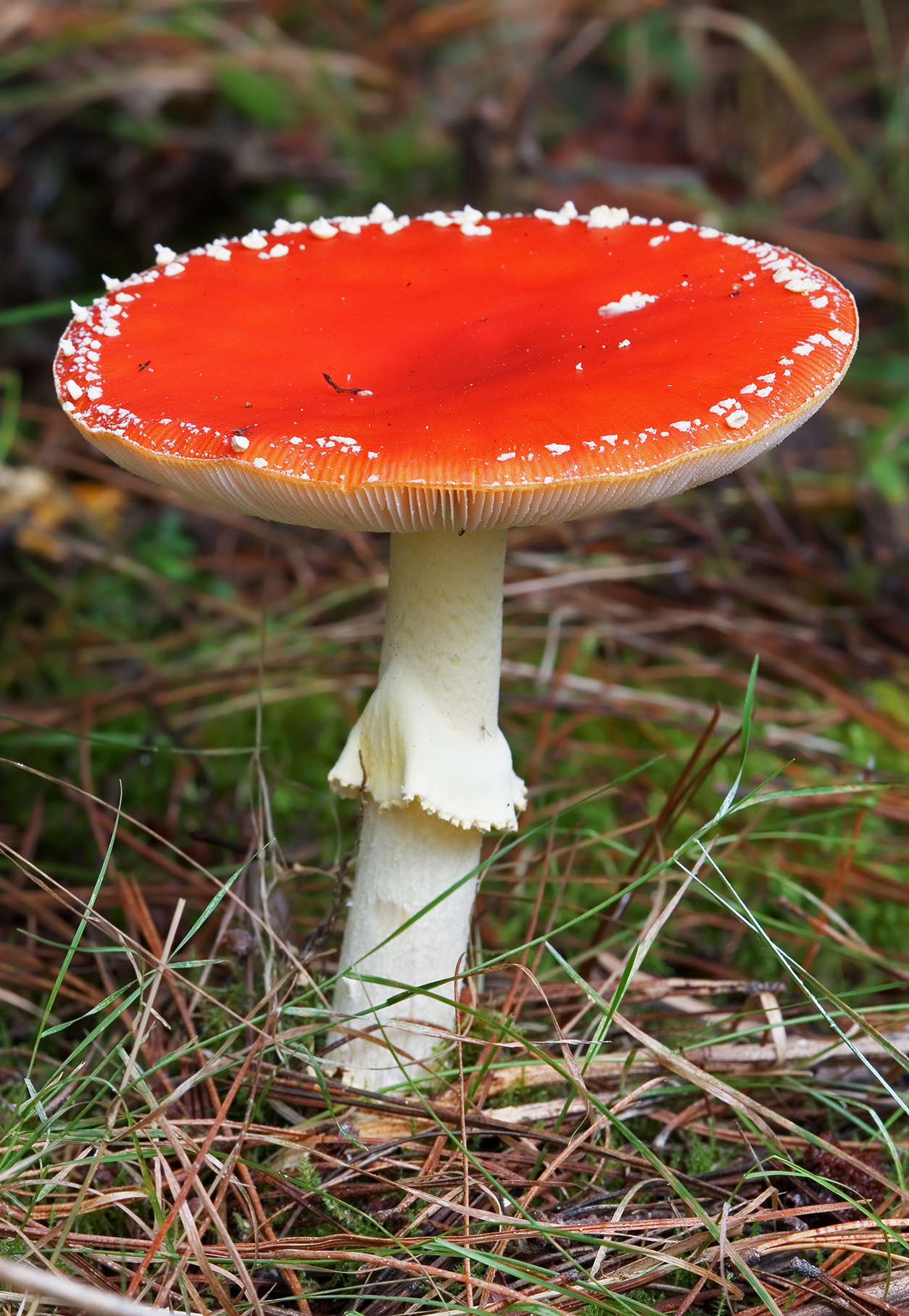
Amanita muscaria has a long and varied history of psychoactive use.

Ethnomycology is the study of the historical uses and sociological impact of fungi and can be considered a subfield of ethnobotany or ethnobiology. Although in theory the term includes fungi used for such purposes as tinder, medicine (medicinal mushrooms) and food (including yeast), it is often used in the context of the study of psychoactive mushrooms such as psilocybin mushrooms, the Amanita muscaria mushroom, and the ergot fungus.

American banker Robert Gordon Wasson pioneered interest in this field of study in the late 1950s, when he and his wife became the first Westerners on record allowed to participate in a mushroom velada, held by the Mazatec curandera María Sabina. The biologist Richard Evans Schultes is also considered an ethnomycological pioneer. Later researchers in the field include Albert Hofmann, Ralph Metzner, Carl Ruck, Blaise Daniel Staples, Giorgio Samorini, Keewaydinoquay Peschel, John W. Allen, Jonathan Ott, Paul Stamets, and Juan Camilo Rodríguez Martínez.

Besides mycological determination in the field, ethnomycology depends to a large extent on anthropology and philology. One of the major debates among ethnomycologists is Wasson's theory that the Soma mentioned in the Rigveda of the Indo-Aryans was the Amanita muscaria mushroom. Following his example similar attempts have been made to identify psychoactive mushroom usage in many other (mostly) ancient cultures, with varying degrees of credibility. Another much written about topic is the content of the Kykeon, the sacrament used during the Eleusinian Mysteries in ancient Greece between approximately 1500 BCE and 396 CE.

The 1990s saw a surge in the recreational use of psilocybin mushrooms due to a combination of a psychedelic revival in the rave culture, improved and simplified cultivation techniques, and the distribution of both the mushrooms themselves and information about them via the Internet. This "mushrooming of mushroom use" has also caused an increased popularization of ethnomycology itself as there are websites and Internet forums where mushroom references in Christmas and fairy tale symbolism are discussed. It remains open to interpretation what effect this popularization has on ethnomycology in the academic world, where the lack of verifiable evidence has kept its theories with their often far-reaching implications shrouded in controversy.

== Sources ==
- Oswaldo Fidalgo, The ethnomycology of the Sanama Indians, Mycological Society of America (1976), ASIN B00072T1TC
- E. Barrie Kavasch, Alberto C. Meloni, American Indian EarthSense: Herbaria of Ethnobotany and Ethnomycology, Birdstone Press, the Institute for American Indian Studies (1996). ISBN 978-0-936322-05-6.
- Aaron Michael Lampman, Tzeltal ethnomycology: Naming, classification and use of mushrooms in the highlands of Chiapas, Mexico, Dissertation, ProQuest Information and Learning (2004)
- Jagjit Singh (ed.), From Ethnomycology to Fungal Biotechnology: Exploiting Fungi from Natural Resources for Novel Products, Springer (1999), ISBN 978-0-306-46059-3.
- Keewaydinoquay Peschel. Puhpohwee for the people: A narrative account of some use of fungi among the Ahnishinaubeg (Ethnomycological studies) Botanical Museum of Harvard University (1978), ASIN: B0006E6KTU
