= Velada (Mazatec ritual) =

Mexican healing rituals

Velada is the name of the healing vigils carried out by Mazatec curanderos (such as María Sabina). The rituals involved the use of psilocybin (magic mushrooms) or Salvia divinorum to commune with God and experience enlightenment.

== History ==
In May 1957, the banker and ethnomycologist R. Gordon Wasson published an article in Life magazine, Seeking the Magic Mushroom, describing his first experience consuming the mushroom and following the Velada of a shaman back in 1955. He claimed to be among the two first modern Western men to follow a traditional Velada ritual on psilocybin. His tale inspired a generation of “mycotourists” seeking to experience the authentic Mazatec Veladas.

Wasson's curandero was Maria Sabina. She was seen as a traitor by her community and rejected. She had received rock stars such as John Lennon, Mick Jagger, and Bob Dylan to follow the Mazatec Velada, which had led to an international exposition of the Mazatec's entheogenic secrets.

== See also ==
- Seeking the Magic Mushroom
- Mazatec people
- Curandero
- María Sabina

== Bibliography ==
- Hernández-Ávila, Inés (2000). "Mediations of the spirit: Native American religious traditions and the ethics of representation". In Lee Irwin (ed.). Native American Spirituality: A Critical Reader. Lincoln: University of Nebraska Press. pp. 11–60. ISBN 0-8032-8261-3. OCLC 43641308.
- Karttunen, Frances E. (1994). Between Worlds: Interpreters, Guides, and Survivors. New Brunswick, NJ: Rutgers University Press. ISBN 0-8135-2030-4. OCLC 28150669.
- Monaghan, John D.; Jeffrey H. Cohen (2000). "Thirty Years of Oaxacan Ethnography". In John D. Monaghan; Patricia A. Andrews; Victoria Reifler Bricker (eds.). Supplement to the Handbook of Middle American Indians, Vol. 6: Ethnology. Austin: University of Texas Press. pp. 150–178. ISBN 0-292-70881-5. OCLC 42786223.
- RAE [Real Academia Española] (2001). Diccionario de la lengua española (in Spanish) (22nd ed.). Madrid: Editorial Espasa Calpe. ISBN 84-239-6814-6. OCLC 48657242. Archived from the original (online version) on 2010-02-06.
