= Clark Heinrich =

Clark Heinrich (born 1945) is an American author living in the coastal mountains of California, specializing in comparative religion and ethno-botany since 1974. He has reportedly studied with masters of yoga and Western mysticism.

He is known for his views on consuming the mushroom fly agaric or Amanita muscaria as a hallucinogenic to achieve religious ecstasy. His book Magic Mushrooms in Religion and Alchemy, which is an improved second edition of his earlier Strange Fruit, explores the role that Amanita muscaria may have played in various mythologies, belief systems and religious art throughout history, such as Native American Anishinaabeg mythology, the Rig Veda, the Puranas, the biblical Old Testament and New Testament, Gnosticism, the Holy Grail legend, Alchemy and Renaissance painting.

The book The Apples of Apollo: Pagan and Christian Mysteries of the Eucharist deals with possible occurrences of entheogens in general, and Amanita muscaria in particular, in Greek and biblical mythology and later on in Renaissance painting, most notably in the Isenheim Altarpiece by Matthias Grünewald.

== Bibliography ==
- Magic Mushrooms in Religion and Alchemy, Park Street Press, 2002 ISBN 0-89281-997-9
- The Apples of Apollo: Pagan and Christian Mysteries of the Eucharist, with Carl A.P. Ruck and Blaise Daniel Staples, Carolina Academic Press, 2001 ISBN 0-89089-924-X
- Strange Fruit: Alchemy, Religion and Magical Foods : a Speculative History, Bloomsbury, 1995 ISBN 0-7475-1548-4
