= Seeking the Magic Mushroom =

1957 photo essay by R. Gordon Wasson

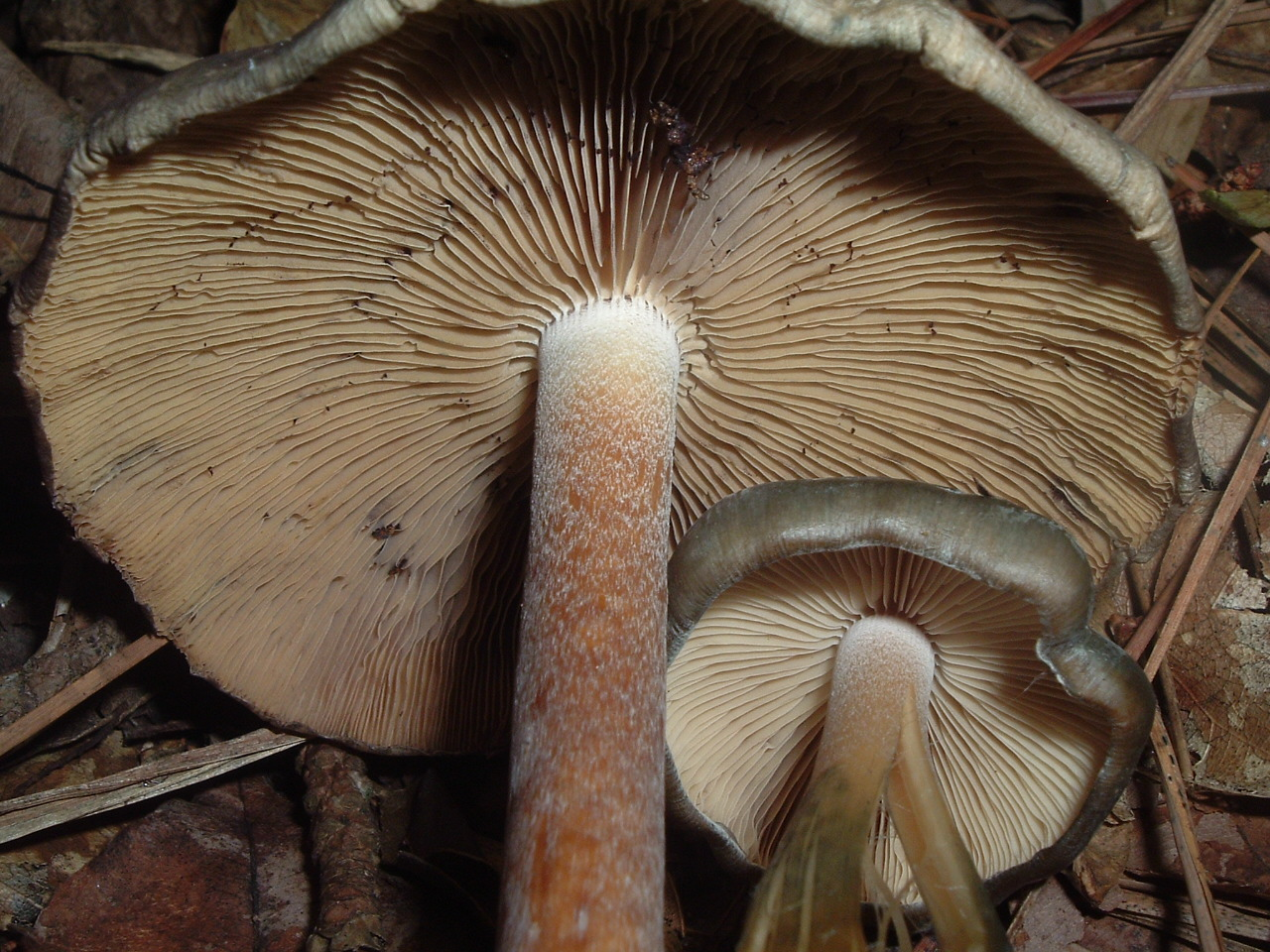
Psilocybe caerulescens var. caerulescens. Wasson ingested this species on June 29, 1955. The experience became the basis for his 1957 essay.

"Seeking the Magic Mushroom" is a 1957 photo essay by amateur mycologist Robert Gordon Wasson describing his experience taking psilocybin mushrooms in 1955 during a Mazatec ritual in Oaxaca, Mexico. Wasson was one of the first Westerners to participate in a Mazatec ceremony and to describe the psychoactive effects of the Psilocybe species. The essay contains photographs by Allan Richardson and illustrations of several mushroom species of Psilocybe collected and identified by French botanist Roger Heim, then director of the French National Museum of Natural History. Wasson's essay, written in a first person narrative, appeared in the May 13 issue of Life magazine as part three of the "Great Adventures" series.

The essay was part of three related works about mushrooms released around the same time period. It was preceded by the limited release of Mushrooms, Russia and History, a two-volume book by Wasson and his wife, Valentina Pavlovna Wasson. The Life magazine essay was followed six days later by "I Ate the Sacred Mushroom", an interview with Valentina in This Week magazine. Against Wasson's wishes, a Life magazine editor added the term "Magic Mushroom" to the title, bringing its use into popular culture. The essay influenced the nascent counterculture in the United States and led many hippies and spiritual seekers (including Timothy Leary) to travel to Mexico in the 1960s in search of the mushroom. In the 1970s, Wasson expressed misgivings about the wide publicity the essay brought to the Mazatec culture and the defilement of the mushroom ritual.

== Background ==
Huautla de Jiménez

Wasson first became interested in mycology during his honeymoon in the Catskill Mountains in 1927. His new wife, Valentina Pavlovna Wasson, a native of Moscow, Russia, was identifying and collecting mushrooms in the forest, having been brought up with an appreciation for this practice. Wasson was disgusted. "Like all good Anglo-Saxons, I knew nothing about the fungal world and felt that the less I knew about those putrid, treacherous excrescences the better." The incident sparked Wasson's interest in mushrooms, leading to subsequent contributions to the field of ethnomycology.

In 1952, English poet Robert Graves sent the Wassons a letter containing a journal article quoting American ethnobotanist Richard Evans Schultes discussing the ritual use of mushrooms by Mesoamericans in the 16th century. The ritual was first observed in modern times in 1938 by American anthropologist Jean Basset Johnson in Huautla de Jiménez, in the Sierra Mazateca region of Oaxaca, Mexico. Beginning in 1953, Wasson repeatedly traveled to Mexico in search of the mushrooms. On a trip to the town of Huautla de Jiménez in June and July 1955, Wasson and New York society photographer Allan Richardson participated in a mushroom ritual with curandera Maria Sabina, where they became, in Wasson's words, "the first white men in recorded history to eat the divine mushrooms." When Wasson returned to the U.S., he sent some of the mushrooms to Dr. Andrija Puharich of the Round Table Foundation in Maine; Puharich analyzed them and identified muscarine, atropine, and bufotenin as the chemicals responsible for hallucinogenic effects, and also used them on himself and others. Among these was the sculptor Harry Stump, in the presence of Aldous Huxley, who paid Puharich a three-week visit in August 1955.

While having lunch at the Century Club in New York in 1956, a Time magazine editor expressed interest in their trip to Mexico and invited them to pitch a story about their experience.

== See also ==
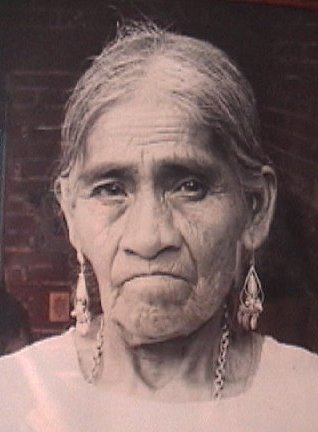
Maria Sabina

- Bufo Alvarius: the Psychedelic Toad of the Sonoran Desert (1984)
