= Valentina Pavlovna Wasson =

Russian-American pediatrician, ethnomycologist and author (1901–1958)

- Valentina Pavlovna Wasson with R. Gordon Wasson
- Born: 1901
- Died: December 31, 1958 (Age 57)
- Citizenship: American
- Scientific career
- Fields: Pediatrician; Ethnomycologist

Valentina Pavlovna (Guercken) Wasson (1901–1958) was a Russian-American pediatrician, ethnomycologist and author. She was involved in the introduction of psychoactive mushrooms to a wide audience in the United States.

== Life ==
Born in Moscow in 1901, Valentina Pavlovna Guercken's family immigrated to the United States during the Russian Revolution. She earned a medical degree at London University in 1927, one year after she married her husband R. Gordon Wasson, a banker. She worked as a pediatrician, publishing research on sinusitis and rheumatic fever in children.

While on her honeymoon in the Catskill Mountains in 1927, Valentina foraged for edible mushrooms in the woods, but her husband refused to eat them. They found that their diverging attitudes towards the plant had roots in the folkloric traditions of Europe, and theorized a deep historical divide between "mycophiles" like the Slavs and "mycophobes" like the Anglo-Saxon peoples. This led them to suspect some deep-seated and ancient taboo against the profane use of an ancient religious sacrament. Described themselves as "ethnomycologists", the couple researched religious and cultural uses of fungi by sending letters to missionaries, linguists, and anthropologists around the world, trying to identify areas where mushrooms possessed significant religious and medical uses. With busy professional lives, the couple pursued the research as a passionate side project, with many of Valentina's colleagues at the hospital she worked at or Gordon's colleagues at Chase bank unaware of their interest in mushrooms.

== Popularization of psychedelic mushrooms ==
In 1952 the poet Robert Graves sent the Wassons an article that mentioned the discovery by Richard Evans Schultes in 1938 of the modern-day survival of the ancient use of intoxicating mushrooms among the Indians in Mexico. Immediately Gordon Wasson telephoned Schultes at Harvard; the confirmation and encouragement he received focused his attention on Mexico.

Valentina and Gordon Wasson organized yearly research expeditions to the remote mountain villages of the monolingual Mazatec Indians of Oaxaca, Mexico, and in 1955 were among the first outsiders in modern times to participate in the midnight rites of the cult of the sacred mushroom.

Beginning in 1953, the Wassons travelled to the Mazatec village Huautla de Jiménez in Mexico to research the traditional use of mushrooms there. They received especially valuable information from American missionary Eunice V. Pike of the Summer Linguistics Institute, and Robert Weitlaner, a Mexican anthropologist who had visited the Mazatec. During several lengthy sojourns in Huautla and environs, the Wassons studied the use of the mushrooms in detail and compared it with descriptions of Aztec mushroom use as described in the records of the Spanish inquisition. They understood this as a potential survival of an otherwise incredibly old tradition involving the use of sacred mushrooms, the Indians kept their beliefs a secret from strangers. It took great tact and skill, therefore, to gain the confidence of the indigenous population and to receive insight into this secret domain. They announced their discovery in 1957 in their jointly written book Mushrooms Russia and History. The Wassons' first book, had begun as a cookbook by Wasson and the Wassons' Russian cook, Florence James. Concurrently, a lengthy illustrated article by R. Gordon in Life Magazine, May 13, 1957, on the Mexican mushroom veladas (sessions) with Maria Sabina brought significant attention to the use of hallucinogenic mushrooms.

Wasson's account of this experience was published in This Week on May 19, 1957, six days after her husband's famous piece was published in Life magazine. In this article, Valentina suggested that Psilocybe mushrooms might be used as a psychotherapeutic agent, placing her alongside psychiatrists like Humphrey Osmund in Saskatchewan who advocated for their use in therapy. She expressed the opinion that if the active agent could be isolated and a sufficient supply assured, it might become a vital tool in the study of psychic processes. She also stated that as the drug would become better known, medical uses would be found for it, perhaps in the treatment of alcoholism, narcotic addiction, mental disorders, and terminal diseases associated with severe pain. Several years later a team of researchers working in Baltimore independently tested the validity of her unusual vision. Aldous Huxley followed her suggestion that the transition to death could be eased by a dose of LSD. Huxley's health had begun to deteriorate in 1960 after he was diagnosed with tongue cancer and then with cancer of the jawbone. On November 22, 1963, lying on his deathbed and unable to speak, he wrote a note to his wife Laura asking for "Try LSD 100 mmg intramuscular", meaning that he wanted an intramuscular injection of 100 micrograms of LSD. She administered the drug as requested, and he died a few hours later.

Valentina Wasson died of cancer on December 31, 1958, at the age of 57. Following her death, Gordon continued their research, working closely with Roger Heim, a French mycologist and the director of the Museum National d'Histoire Naturelle, who had accompanied the Wassons on several expeditions to Mexico and provided determinations for the mycological samples they collected in Mexico.

== Bibliography ==
- Wasson, Valentina Pavlovna (1939). The chosen baby. New York: J.B. Lippincott.
- Wasson, Valentina Pavlovna; Wasson, R. Gordon (1957). Mushrooms: Russia and History. Pantheon Books.
- "I Ate the Sacred Mushroom". This Week Magazine. May 19, 1957.

== Recordings ==
- Maria Sabína – Mushroom Ceremony Of The Mazatec Indians Of Mexico. Recorded by V. P. & R. G. Wasson in Huautla de Jiménez, in the Mazatec Mountains in the northern corner of the State of Oaxaca, July 21, 1956
