= Blaise Daniel Staples =

American academic

(Blaise) Daniel "Danny" Staples (13 July 1948 – December 2005) was a Classical mythologist; a native of Somerset, Massachusetts, he received a B.A. in Comparative Religion and a Ph.D. in Classical Studies from Boston University. He lived in Hull, Massachusetts, with his spouse, Carl A.P. Ruck.

He co-authored with Ruck The World of Classical Mythology: Gods and Goddesses, Heroines and Heroes, which has become a standard textbook. The book The Road to Eleusis: Unveiling the Secret of the Mysteries claims that the psycho-active ingredient in the secret kykeion potion used in the Eleusinian Mysteries was most likely the ergotism-causing fungus Claviceps purpurea. For this book, Staples translated the Homeric Hymn to Demeter and contributed with R. Gordon Wasson, Jonathan Ott, and Ruck to the chapter in which the term "entheogen" was coined as an alternative for terms such as "psychedelic", "hallucinogen," and "drug" that can be misleading in certain contexts. The Apples of Apollo: Pagan and Christian Mysteries of the Eucharist explores the role that entheogens in general, and Amanita muscaria in particular, played in Greek and biblical mythology and later on in Renaissance painting, most notably in the Isenheim Altarpiece by Matthias Grünewald.

Staples was also the author of numerous articles in his field.

== Bibliography ==
- The Hidden World: Survival of Pagan Shamanic Themes in European Fairytales, with Carl Ruck, José Alfredo González Celdrán and Mark Alwin Hoffman (2007 ISBN 1-59460-144-5)
- The Apples of Apollo: Pagan and Christian Mysteries of the Eucharist, with Carl Ruck and Clark Heinrich (2001, ISBN 0-89089-924-X)
- The World of Classical Myth: Gods and Goddesses, Heroines and Heroes, with Carl Ruck (1994, ISBN 0-89089-575-9)
- The Road to Eleusis: Unveiling the Secret of the Mysteries, with Carl Ruck, R. Gordon Wasson, Jonathan Ott and Albert Hofmann (1978, ISBN 978-1-55643-752-6)
