= María Sabina =

Mexican sabia and poet (1894–1985)

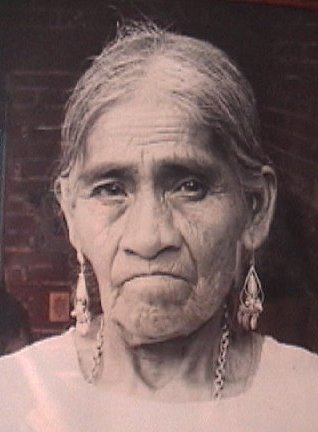
- A photo of María Sabina taken in Huautla, Oaxaca, Mexico.
- Born: 22 July 1894; Oaxaca, Mexico
- Died: 23 November 1985 (aged 91); Mexico
- Occupations: Natural healer, Sabia, use of natural materials, indigenous rituals

María Sabina Magdalena García (22 July 1894 – 23 November 1985) was a Mazatec sabia (wise woman) and poet who lived in Huautla de Jiménez, a town in the Sierra Mazateca area of the Mexican state of Oaxaca in southern Mexico. Her healing sacred mushroom ceremonies, called veladas, were based on the use of psilocybin mushrooms, particularly Psilocybe caerulescens, a sacred mushroom important to the Mazatecs. María Sabina's veladas contributed to the popularization of indigenous Mexican ritual use of entheogenic mushrooms among westerners, though this was not her intent.

== Life and death ==
María Sabina was born outside of Huautla de Jiménez in the Sierra Mazateca toward the end of the 19th century. Though Sabina herself was not sure, she believed her birth year was 1894. Her parents were both campesinos; her mother was María Concepción, while her father, Crisanto Feliciano, died from an illness when she was three years old. She had a younger sister, María Ana. Her grandfather and great-grandfather on her father's side were also skilled in using the mushrooms to communicate with God, according to their beliefs. After the death of her father, her mother moved the family into town, and Sabina grew up in the house of her maternal grandparents.

María Sabina died in poverty, suffering from malnutrition later in life.

== Interaction with the Western world ==
María Sabina's interactions with the Western world, starting with R. Gordon Wasson, have been described, from an indigenous perspective, as "a story of extraction, cultural appropriation, bioprospecting, and colonization." María Sabina was named by foreigners the first contemporary Mexican curandera to allow Westerners to participate in the healing ritual known as the velada. María Sabina herself stated that she was not a curandera, that she was in fact a sabia, and that a sabia and curandera are not the same practice. Before becoming a sabia, María Sabina tried curanderismo but felt it to be very wrong for her.

All participants in the ritual ingested psilocybin mushroom as a sacrament to open the gates of the mind. The velada is seen as a purification and a communion with the sacred.

In 1955, American ethnomycologist and banker R. Gordon Wasson, and his wife Valentina, a Russian pediatrician and scientist, as well as a passionate mycology enthusiast, visited María Sabina's hometown, where Gordon Wasson participated in a velada with her. Wasson was the first outsider to take part in the velada, and to gain access to the ceremony (which was used to locate missing people and important items), Wasson lied and told her that he was worried about his son back home and wanted information about his whereabouts and well-being, later admitting that this was a deception. The Wassons collected spores of the fungus, which they identified as Psilocybe mexicana, and took them to Paris. The fungus was cultivated in Europe and its primary psychoactive ingredient, psilocybin, was isolated in the laboratory by Swiss chemist Albert Hofmann in 1958.

Wasson wrote a book about his experience of the ritual in a 1957 Life magazine article, Seeking the Magic Mushroom; María Sabina's name and location were not revealed. However, as author Michael Pollan notes, "Wasson was halfhearted in his desire to protect María Sabina's identity" – Wasson later published 512 copies of his two-volume book called Russia, Mushrooms and History, the second volume of which revealed her identity and location, an action which has been described as violating her consent and abusing her hospitality. The information was contained in an account of his and his wife's first velada with Aurelio Carreras, María Sabina's son-in-law, on 15 August 1953, two years before they consumed the mushrooms themselves.

Young people from the United States began seeking out María Sabina and the "magic" mushrooms as early as 1962, with numerous hippies, scientists, and other people visiting the remote isolated village of Huautla de Jimenez.

Due to young American visitors' lack of respect for the sacred and traditional uses of los niños santos María Sabina remarked:

Before Wasson, nobody took the children simply to find God. They were always taken to cure the sick.

As the community was besieged by Westerners wanting to experience the mushroom-induced hallucinations, Sabina attracted attention from the Mexican police who believed her to be a drug dealer. The unwanted attention completely altered the social dynamics of the Mazatec community and threatened to terminate the Mazatec custom. The community blamed Sabina; consequently she was ostracized, her house was burned down, her son was murdered, and she was briefly jailed. Sabina later regretted having introduced Wasson to the practice, but Wasson contended that his only intention was to contribute to the sum of human knowledge, despite being funded by the CIA's mind control project MKUltra. Though later released documents reveal Wasson was unaware of the true intention behind the funding. The way that he is credited in modern history with "discovering" the power of the sacred mushrooms, has been described as a narrative which "mimic[s], in many ways, the colonialist language of "discovery"."

From 1967 to 1977 life returned to normal conditions for Huautla de Jimenez and the Mazatec after the Mexican Army blocked American, European and Mexican hippies or other unwanted visitors from entering on the only roads into the town. A few Federales also patrolled the town to evict undesirable foreign visitors.

Álvaro Estrada wrote a biography of María Sabina that was translated into English by Henry Munn. Sabina spoke only Mazatec and many of her supposed quotes in English are not verified. Munn, who had lived in Huautla de Jimenez and knew the Mazatec language, wrote two reports on sacred mushroom veladas and curanderos: The Mushrooms of Language was about the traditional ceremonies of the typical curanderos in Huautla; the second was called The Uniqueness of María Sabina. Another book on her song-poem chants was María Sabina: Selections by Jerome Rothenberg. The Sacred Mushroom of Mexico, by Brian Akers, has excerpts from five Mexican authors translated from Spanish to English. Los Hongos Alucinantes (in Spanish) by Fernando Benitez dispels many rumors about her life.

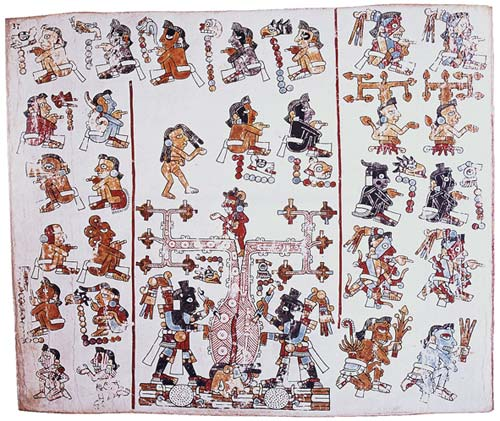
Plate 37 of the Codex Vindobonensis or Yuta Tnoho (Mixtec culture, Late Post-Classic Mesoamerican)

The book Sacred Mushroom Rituals: The Search for the Blood of Quetzalcoatl, by Tom Lane, has several chapters by the author on the experiences he, his wife, and a friend had at her home in a velada with María Sabina and her daughter Appolonia. The book reports on María's musical tonal songs, poetic expressions, ventriloquy, incantations and chanting during the velada. The rituals before the ceremony and prayers for the participants are similar to those recorded by Wasson in his visits during the mid-1950s. After publishing his book on ethnomycology, Russia, Mushrooms and History, Wasson wrote María Sabina and her Mazatec Mushroom Velada with George and Florence Cowan and Willard Rhodes, which included four cassette recordings and the musical score of Sabina's veladas, with lyrics translated from Mazatec to Spanish to English. Henry Munn later translated these songs into English in Álvaro Estrada's book.

The entheogenic use of the sacred mushrooms (hongos sagrados) practiced by María Sabina had roots in Pre-Columbian Mexico. By her meeting R. Gordon Wasson and her veladas being recorded in the mid-1950s, these ancient Mazatec ceremonies and rituals entered Western knowledge systems, although they existed within Mazatec culture, intentionally hidden, for centuries. Similar ceremonies were recorded in the late Post-Classic Mesoamerican Mixtec codex Yuta Tnoho or Vindobonensis Mexicanus I (Latin), written in the 16th century, and in the Three Stelae of Xochimilco, but until Wasson met María Sabina in the early 1950s there was almost no proof that the sacred mushroom healing and divination ceremonies and rituals actually existed. Academics note that before Wasson's account, there was "little to no evidence" of the medicinal properties of the psilocybin mushrooms in western scientific literature, thus confirming the pivotal role that Sabina and the Mazatec community had in all Western uses of the mushrooms.

== Use of synthetic entheogens ==
In 1958, the French mycologist Roger Heim brought psilocybin tablets to María Sabina and the first velada using the active principle of the mushrooms rather than the raw mushrooms themselves took place. In 1962, R. Gordon Wasson and Albert Hofmann went to Mexico to visit her. They also brought a bottle of psilocybin pills. Sandoz was marketing them under the brand name Indocybin—"indo" for both Indian and indole (the nucleus of their chemical structures) and "cybin" for the main molecular constituent, psilocybin. Hofmann gave his synthesized entheogen to the curandera. "Of course, Wasson recalled, Albert Hofmann is so conservative he always gives too little a dose, and it didn't have any effect." Hofmann had a different interpretation: "activation of the pills, which must dissolve in the stomach, takes place after 30 to 45 minutes. In contrast, the mushrooms when chewed, work faster as the drug is absorbed immediately". To settle her doubts about the pills, more were distributed. María, her daughter, and the curandero, Don Aurelio, ingested up to 30 mg each, a moderately high dose by current standards but not perhaps by the more experienced practitioners. At dawn, their Mazatec interpreter reported that María Sabina felt there was little difference between the pills and the mushrooms. She thanked Hofmann for the bottle of pills, saying that she would now be able to serve people even when no mushrooms were available.

Chemical compounds derived from the Psilocybe mushrooms Sabina introduced to Wasson now form part of pharmaceutical products which are patented and now worth billions of dollars. However, Mazatec indigenous communities who are responsible for discovering and stewarding the medicinal properties of psilocybin mushrooms do not hold any of these patents, and as such do not benefit financially at all from their contribution. Ethical concerns have been raised about the way that the Mazatec's indigenous knowledge was commodified and profited from, without any acknowledgement, recognition or involvement of the indigenous roots of this knowledge, which came via Sabina.

== Chants and poetry ==
Álvaro Estrada, a fellow Mazatec, recorded her life and work and translated her chants. Estrada's American brother-in-law, Henry Munn, translated many of the chants from Spanish to English, and wrote about the significance of her language. Munn wrote that María Sabina brilliantly used themes common to Mazatec and Mesoamerican spiritual traditions, but at the same time was "a unique talent, a masterful oral poet, and craftsperson with a profound literary and personal charisma". Mexican poet Homero Aridjis described her as "the greatest visionary poet in twentieth-century Latin America."

It is sung in a trance in which, as she recounted, the "saint children" speak through her:

Because I can swim in the immense
Because I can swim in all forms
Because I am the launch woman
Because I am the sacred opossum
Because I am the Lord opossum

I am the woman Book that is beneath the water, says
I am the woman of the populous town, says
I am the shepherdess who is beneath the water, says
I am the woman who shepherds the immense, says
I am a shepherdess and I come with my shepherd, says

Because everything has its origin
And I come going from place to place from the origin...

== Cultural impact ==
Sabina is regarded as a sacred figure in Huautla. At the same time, her image is used to market various local commercial ventures, from restaurants to taxi companies.

The Mexican counterculture has an affinity for Sabina. The Mexican rock group Santa Sabina is named after her, and El Tri, one of the first and most successful rock groups in Mexico, dedicated the song "María Sabina" to her, proclaiming her "un símbolo de la sabiduría y el amor" ("a symbol of wisdom and love").

Mexican musician Jorge Reyes included prerecorded chants of María Sabina in the track "The Goddess of the Eagles", in his album Comala. Reyes also used more of the recording in his collaboration with Deep Forest on the track "Tres Marías", from the album Comparsa.

Italian photographer Gusmano Cesaretti published a book, Maria Sabina: en busca del Cristo Negro, about his experience meeting Maria Sabina in 1982.

Bolivian singer Luzmila Carpio has recorded a song in honor of María Sabina.

Mexican singer Natalia Lafourcade has recorded a song "Maria La Curandera" inspired by Maria Sabina's famous poem titled, "Curate Mijita".

Mexican poet and novelist Homero Aridjis has written a novel, Carne de Dios, about María Sabina, her life in Huautla and her experience with Westerners who flocked to her home to experience the hallucinogenic effects of the mushrooms. Aridjis brought María Sabina to Mexico City for medical treatment towards the end of her life. Huautla de Jimenez was without electricity and few signs of the 20th century until after María Sabina died in 1985. The Mazatec sacred mushroom veladas have survived into the 21st century and are now accepted by the Catholic Church there.

== General and cited references ==
- Allen, John W. (1997). María Sabina: Saint Mother of the Sacred Mushrooms. Ethnomycological journals, v. 1. Seattle, WA: Psilly Publications. ISBN 0-9631518-9-4. OCLC 39920921.
- Allen, John W., and Jochen Gartz, 2002. Teonanácatl: A Bibliography of Entheogenic Mushrooms (ISBN 1-58214-099-5)
- Estrada, Álvaro, (1976) Vida de María Sabina: la sabia de los hongos (ISBN 968-23-0513-6)
- Estrada, Álvaro, (1981). María Sabina: her Life and Chants (ISBN 0-915520-33-8)
- Estrada, Álvaro (1996). Huautla en tiempo de hippies (in Spanish). Mexico: Grijalbo. ISBN 970-05-0665-7. OCLC 35986756.
- Gonzáles, Enrique, (1992). Conversaciones con María Sabina y Otros Curanderos (ISBN 968-20-0158-7) (in Spanish)
- Guerrero, Rita, (n.d.). "¿Qué nombre le ponemos?", Chapter 3 of the History of Santa Sabina
- Harner, Michael J., ed. Hallucinogens and Shamanism. ISBN 0-19-501649-1.
- Karttunen, Frances E. (1994). Between Worlds: Interpreters, Guides, and Survivors. New Brunswick, NJ: Rutgers University Press. ISBN 0-8135-2030-4. OCLC 28150669.
- RAE [Real Academia Española] (2001). Diccionario de la lengua española (in Spanish) (22nd ed.). Madrid: Editorial Espasa Calpe. ISBN 84-239-6814-6. OCLC 48657242. Archived from the original (online version) on 2010-02-06.
- Monaghan, John D.; Jeffrey H. Cohen (2000). "Thirty Years of Oaxacan Ethnography". In John D. Monaghan (Volume ed.), with Patricia A. Andrews (ed.). Supplement to the Handbook of Middle American Indians, Vol. 6: Ethnology. Victoria Reifler Bricker (General Editor). Austin: University of Texas Press. pp. 150–178. ISBN 0-292-70881-5. OCLC 42786223.
- Rothenberg, Jerome, ed. (2003). María Sabina: Selections (ISBN 0-520-23953-9)
- Verroust, Vincent (June 2019). "De la découverte des champignons à psilocybine à la renaissance psychédélique". Ethnopharmacologia, no. 61: 8–17.
- Zolov, Eric, (1999). Refried Elvis: The Rise of the Mexican Counterculture (ISBN 0-520-21514-1)
