= Carl A. P. Ruck =

American professor of Classical Studies

Carl Anton Paul Ruck (born December 8, 1935, Bridgeport, Connecticut) is a professor in the Classical Studies department at Boston University. He received his B.A. at Yale University, his M.A. at the University of Michigan, and a Ph.D. at Harvard University. He lives in Hull, Massachusetts.

== Entheogen theory ==
Carl Ruck is best known for his work along with other scholars in mythology and religion on the sacred role of entheogens, or psychoactive plants that induce an altered state of consciousness, as used in religious or shamanistic rituals. His focus has been on the use of entheogens in classical western culture, as well as their historical influence on modern western religions. He currently teaches a mythology class at Boston University that presents this theory in depth.

The book The Road to Eleusis: Unveiling the Secret of the Mysteries, co-authored by Ruck with Albert Hofmann and R. Gordon Wasson, makes a case that the psycho-active ingredient in the secret kykeion potion used in the Eleusinian Mysteries was most likely the ergotism-causing fungus Claviceps purpurea. Furthermore the book introduced for the first time the term "entheogen" as an alternative for terms such as "psychedelic", "hallucinogen" and "drug" that can be misleading in certain contexts.

The Apples of Apollo: Pagan and Christian Mysteries of the Eucharist (2001) explores the role that entheogens in general, and Amanita muscaria in particular, played in Greek and biblical mythology and later on in Renaissance painting, most notably in the Isenheim Altarpiece by Matthias Grünewald.

In January 2003 Ruck came to public attention commenting on a book by the cannabis activist Chris Bennett. He was quoted in The Guardian, and then wrote an article for The Sunday Times. His later work explored entheogenic connections to the Roman cult of Mithras.

== Bibliography ==
- Entheogens, Myth, and Human Consciousness, with Mark Alwin Hoffman (2013, ISBN 1-57951-141-4)
- The Effluents of Deity: Alchemy and Psychoactive Sacraments in Medieval and Renaissance Art, with Mark Alwin Hoffman (2012, ISBN 1-61163-041-X)
- Mushrooms, Myth and Mithras: The Drug Cult that Civilized Europe, with Mark Alwin Hoffman and Jose Alfredo Gonzalez Celdran (2009, ISBN 0-87286-470-7)
- The Hidden World: Survival of Pagan Shamanic Themes in European Fairytales, with Blaise Daniel Staples, José Alfredo González Celdrán and Mark Alwin Hoffman (2007, ISBN 1-59460-144-5)
- Sacred Mushrooms of the Goddess: Secrets of Eleusis (2006, ISBN 978-1-57951-030-5)
- 'The Apples of Apollo: Pagan and Christian Mysteries of the Eucharist, with Clark Heinrich and Blaise Daniel Staples (2000, ISBN 0-89089-924-X)
- Intensive Latin: First Year and Review (1997)
- The World of Classical Myth: Gods and Goddesses, Heroines and Heroes, with Blaise Daniel Staples (1994, ISBN 0-89089-575-9)
- Persephone's Quest: Entheogens and the Origins of Religion, with R. Gordon Wasson, Stella Kramrisch and Jonathan Ott (1988)
- Latin: A Concise Structural Course (1987)
- Ancient Greek: A New Approach (1972, 2nd ed. 1979)
- The Road to Eleusis: Unveiling the Secret of the Mysteries, with R. Gordon Wasson, Albert Hofmann and Blaise Daniel Staples (1978, ISBN 978-1-55643-752-6)
- Pindar: Selected Odes (1967)
- The List of Victors in Comedies at the Dionysia (1967)
