= R. Gordon Wasson =

American ethnobiologist and author (1898–1986)

Robert Gordon Wasson
- Wasson in 1955
- Born: September 22, 1898; Great Falls, Montana, U.S.
- Died: December 23, 1986 (aged 88); Danbury, Connecticut, U.S.
- Education: Columbia University Graduate School of Journalism; London School of Economics
- Awards: Pulitzer Travelling Scholarship
- Scientific career
- Fields: Ethnomycology

Robert Gordon Wasson (September 22, 1898 – December 23, 1986) was an American author, ethnomycologist, and a Vice President for Public Relations at J.P. Morgan & Co.

Wasson spent most of his career in banking in his position at J.P. Morgan. Later in his life, despite having little formal training in the field, he turned his interests to the study of hallucinogenic mushrooms, religion, and ethnomycology, publishing papers that received attention and acclaim. In the course of work funded by the Central Intelligence Agency (CIA), Wasson made contributions to the fields of ethnobotany, botany, and anthropology.

In his 1968 published study on the botanical identity of soma–haoma, Wasson suggested that "soma" described in the Rigveda was the fly agaric mushroom, and "haoma" in the Avesta was a hallucinogen.

== Career ==
=== Banking industry ===
Wasson began his banking career at Guaranty Trust Company in 1928, and moved to J.P. Morgan & Co. in 1934. That same year, he published a book on the Hall Carbine Affair, in which he attempted to exonerate John Pierpont Morgan from guilt with respect to the incident, which had been viewed as an example of wartime profiteering. As early as 1937, Wasson had been attempting to influence historians Allan Nevins and Charles McLean Andrews regarding Morgan's role in the affair; he used Nevins' report as a reference for his own book on the topic. The matter of Morgan's responsibility for the Hall Carbine Incident remains controversial.

On July 16, 1941, the directors of Morgan & Co. appointed Wasson to the position of assistant secretary, and by 1943 he was vice president for public relations.

=== Ethnomycology ===
Wasson's studies in ethnomycology began during his 1927 honeymoon trip to the Catskill Mountains when his wife, Valentina Pavlovna Guercken, a pediatrician, chanced upon some edible wild mushrooms. Fascinated by the marked difference in cultural attitudes towards fungi in Russia compared to the United States, the couple began field research that led to the publication of Mushrooms, Russia and History in 1957.

In the course of their investigations they mounted expeditions to Mexico to study the religious use of mushrooms by the native population, and claimed to have been the first Westerners to participate in a Mazatec mushroom ritual.

It was the curandera María Sabina who both allowed the Wassons to participate in the ritual and who taught them about the uses and effects of the mushroom in 1955. In 1957 Wasson published a 10-page spread in TIME LIFE magazine about his mushroom ceremony with Sabina and stating he had "found God." This led to hundreds of Americans traveling to Sabina's village to take mushrooms themselves. As a result Sabina was ostracised from her community, and her house was burned down after she was briefly jailed.

At the 1951 annual meeting of the American Council of Learned Societies, held in Rye, New York, on January 24–26, Wasson was appointed a member of the Executive Committee for a period of one year.

Some of Wasson's colleagues, such as Ethel Dunn, disagreed with Wasson's conclusions regarding Amanita muscaria.

==== CIA funding ====
Wasson's 1956 expedition was funded by the CIA's MK-Ultra subproject 58, as was revealed by documents obtained by John Marks under the Freedom of Information Act. The documents state that Wasson was an "unwitting" participant in the project.

The funding was provided under the cover name of the Geschickter Fund for Medical Research (credited by Wasson at the end of his subsequent Life piece about the expedition).

== Role in popularizing psilocybin mushrooms ==
In May 1957, Life magazine published an article titled "Seeking the Magic Mushroom," which introduced psychedelic mushrooms to a wide audience for the first time. Six days later, his wife Valentina's first-person account of their research expedition in Mexico was published on the cover of This Week, a Sunday magazine inserted in 37 newspapers that reach almost 12 million total readers.

In his memoir, author Tom Robbins talks about the impact of this article on "turning on" Americans himself included. The article sparked immense interest in the Mazatec ritual practice among beatniks and hippies, an interest that proved disastrous for the Mazatec community and for María Sabina in particular. As the community was besieged by Westerners wanting to experience the mushroom-induced hallucinations, Sabina attracted attention by the Mexican police who thought that she sold drugs to the foreigners. The unwanted attention completely altered the social dynamics of the Mazatec community and threatened to terminate the Mazatec custom. The community blamed Sabina, and she was ostracized in the community and had her house burned down. Sabina later regretted having introduced Wasson to the practice, but Wasson contended that his only intention was to contribute to the sum of human knowledge.

=== Methodology ===
Together, Wasson and botanist Roger Heim collected and identified various species of family Strophariaceae and genus Psilocybe, while Albert Hofmann, using material grown by Heim from specimens collected by the Wassons, identified the chemical structure of the active compounds, psilocybin and psilocin. Hofmann and Wasson were also among the first Westerners to collect specimens of the Mazatec hallucinogen Salvia divinorum, though these specimens were later deemed not suitable for rigorous scientific study or taxonomic classification. Two species of mushroom, Psilocybe wassonii R.Heim and Psilocybe wassoniorum Guzman & S.H.Pollock, were named in honor of Wasson by Heim and Gastón Guzmán, the latter of whom Wasson met during an expedition to Huautla de Jiménez in 1957.

Wasson's next major contribution was a study of the ancient Vedic intoxicant soma, which he hypothesized was based on the psychoactive fly agaric (Amanita muscaria) mushroom. This hypothesis was published in 1967 under the title Soma: Divine Mushroom of Immortality. His attention then turned to the Eleusinian Mysteries, the initiation ceremony of the ancient Greek cult of Demeter and Persephone. In The Road to Eleusis: Unveiling the Secret of the Mysteries (1978), co-authored with Albert Hofmann and Carl A. P. Ruck, it was proposed that the special potion "kykeon", a pivotal component of the ceremony, contained psychoactive ergoline alkaloids from the fungus Ergot (Claviceps spp.).

Several of his books were self-published in illustrated, limited editions, using handmade paper and printed in Italy, that have never been reprinted, with one exception. His last completed work, The Wondrous Mushroom, initially part of the self-published works, was republished by City Lights Publishers in 2014.

== Ethnography ==
Prior to his work on soma, theologians had interpreted the Vedic and Magian practices to have been based on alcoholic beverages that produced inebriation. Wasson was the first researcher to propose that the actual form of Vedic intoxication was entheogenic.

== Legacy ==
Wasson donated his personal papers as a gift to the Harvard University Botanical Museum, as part of the "Tina and Gordon Wasson Ethnomycological Collection." The thoroughly curated array of books, papers, and artifacts contained in the collection was fully settled into its new adoptive home by April 1982.

Wasson's obituary in the San Francisco Chronicle stated that together with his wife and co-author, Valentina P. Wasson, he had "illuminated the sanctity of psychotropic mushrooms, not only in Russia and Siberia, but also in the most ancient of Hindu scriptures, in the mystery cults of ancient Greece and among the native peoples of Mexico and Guatemala, both ancient and modern."

In 2015, the Mycological Society of America (MSA) created a new award named for both Gordon and Valentina in order to recognize non-professionals and people with non-traditional academic backgrounds who have made outstanding contributions to mycology. The first "Gordon and Tina Wasson Award" was presented to Paul Stamets on July 29, 2015, by the organization's former president, D. Jean Lodge, during the MSA meeting in Edmonton, Canada.

== Bibliography ==
=== Articles ===
- "Another View of the Historian's Treatment of Business." Bulletin of the Business Historical Society, vol. 18, no. 3 (June 1944), pp. 62–68. doi:10.2307/3111364. JSTOR 3111364.
- "The Etymology of Botargo," with John P. Hughes. American Journal of Philology, vol. 68, no. 4 (1947), pp. 414–418. doi:10.2307/291531. JSTOR 291531.
- "Seeking the Magic Mushroom." Life, vol. 42, no. 19 (May 13, 1957), pp. 100–110, 113-114, 117-118, 120. Google Books. PDF. Archived here:
- "The Hallucinogenic Mushrooms," with Valentina P. Wasson. Garden Journal, vol. 8 (January/February 1958), pp. 1–6.
- "The Divine Mushroom: Primitive Religion and Hallucinatory Agents." Proceedings of the American Philosophical Society, vol. 102, no. 3 (June 24, 1958), pp. 221–223. JSTOR 985574.
- "The Hallucinogenic Mushrooms of Mexico: An Adventure in Ethnomycological Exploration." Transactions of the New York Academy of Sciences, vol. 21, no. 4 (February 1959), pp. 325–339. Originally presented at a meeting of the Division on January 23, 1959.
- "The Hallucinogenic Fungi of Mexico: An Inquiry into the Origins of the Religious Idea among Primitive Peoples." Botanical Museum Leaflets, Harvard University, vol. 19, no. 7 (February 17, 1961), pp. 137–162. JSTOR 41762213.
- "A New Mexican Psychtropic Drug from the Mint Family." Botanical Museum Leaflets, Harvard University, vol. 20, no. 3 (December 28, 1962), pp. 77–84. JSTOR 41762226.
- "The Hallucinogenic Mushrooms of Mexico and Psilocybin: A Bibliography (Second Printing, with Corrections and Addenda)." Botanical Museum Leaflets, Harvard University, vol. 20, no. 2 (March 10, 1963), pp. 25–73. JSTOR 41762224.
- "Notes on the Present Status of the Ololiuhqui and the Other Hallucinogens of Mexico." Botanical Museum Leaflets, Harvard University, vol. 20, no. 6 (November 22, 1963), pp. 161–193. JSTOR 41762230.
- "The 'Mushroom Madness' of the Kuma," with Roger Heim. Botanical Museum Leaflets, Harvard University, vol. 21, no. 1 (June 11, 1965), pp. 1–31, 33-36. JSTOR 41762949.
- "Soma: Comments Inspired by Professor Kuiper's Review." Indo-Iranian Journal, vol. 12, no. 4 (1970), pp. 286–298. JSTOR 24650694.
- "Drugs: The Sacred Mushroom." New York Times (September 26, 1970), p. 21.
- "The Soma of the Rig Veda: What Was It?" Journal of the American Oriental Society, vol. 91, no. 2 (April/June 1971), pp. 169–187. doi:10.2307/600096. JSTOR 600096.
- "The Death of Claudius, or Mushrooms for Murderers." Botanical Museum Leaflets, Harvard University, vol. 23, no. 3 pp. (April 7, 1972), pp. 101–126. JSTOR 41762274.
- "The Role of 'Flowers' in Nahuatl Culture: A Suggested Interpretation." Botanical Museum Leaflets, Harvard University, vol. 23, no. 8 (November 30, 1973), pp. 305–321. JSTOR 41762283.
- "The Last Meal of the Buddha." Journal of the American Oriental Society, vol. 102, no. 4 (October/December 1982), pp. 591–603.
  - Republished: Botanical Museum Leaflets, Harvard University, vol. 29, no. 3 (Summer 1983), pp. 219–249. JSTOR 41762849.
- "Carved 'Disembodied Eyes' of Theotihuacan," with Jonathan Ott. Botanical Museum Leaflets, Harvard University, vol. 29, no. 4 (Fall 1983), pp. 387–400. JSTOR 41762856.

=== Books ===
- The Hall Carbine Affair: A Study in Contemporary Folklore. New York: Pandick Press (1941)
- Mushrooms, Russia and History, with Valentina Pavlovna Wasson. New York: Pantheon Books (1957)
- Soma: Divine Mushroom of Immortality (1968)
- Maria Sabina and Her Mazatec Mushroom Velada. New York: Harcourt (1976)
- The Road to Eleusis: Unveiling the Secret of the Mysteries, with Albert Hofmann and Carl A. P. Ruck. New York: Harcourt (1978)
- The Wondrous Mushroom: Mycolatry in Mesoamerica. New York: McGraw-Hill (1980). (Reprint by City Lights, 2012.)
- Persephone's Quest: Entheogens and the Origins of Religion, with Stella Kramrisch, Jonathan Ott, and Carl A. P. Ruck. Ethnomycological Studies, no. 10. New Haven: Yale University Press (1986)

=== Book contributions ===
- "Mushrooms." In: The Drug Experience: First Person Accounts of Addicts, Writers, Scientists and Others, edited by David Ebin. New York: Orion Press (1961), pp. 311–334.
- "The Divine Mushroom of Immortality" (Chapter 6). In: Flesh of the Gods: The Ritual Use of Hallucinogens. New York: Praeger (1972), pp. 185–200.
- "What Was the Soma of the Aryans?" (Chapter 7) In: Flesh of the Gods: The Ritual Use of Hallucinogens. New York: Praeger (1972), pp. 201–213.

=== Book reviews ===
- Review of Full Employment in a Free Society by William Beveridge. Harvard Business Review (Summer 1945)
- Review of The Teachings of Don Juan: A Yaqui Way of Knowledge by Carlos Castaneda. Economic Botany, vol. 23, no. 2 (1969), p. 197.
- Review of A Separate Reality: Further Conversations with Don Juan by Carlos Castaneda. Economic Botany, vol. 26, no. 1 (1972), pp. 98–99.
- Review of Journey to Ixtlan: The Lessons of Don Juan by Carlos Castaneda. Economic Botany. vol. 27, no. 1 (1973), pp. 151–152.
- Review of Tales of Power by Carlos Castaneda. Economic Botany. vol. 28, no. 3 (1974), pp. 245–246.

=== Correspondence ===
- Letter to Allen Dulles (June 3, 1960)

=== Music ===
- Maria Sabína. Mushroom Ceremony of the Mazatec Indians of Mexico (1957). Folkways Records [FR 8975].

Recorded (on July 21/22, 1956) and produced with Valentina Pavlovna Wasson. Liner notes by R. Gordon Wasson. Folkways is now the nonprofit record label of the Smithsonian Institution.
