= C12H16N2O =

The molecular formula C_{12}H_{16}N_{2}O (molar mass: 204.26 g/mol, exact mass: 204.126263 u) may refer to:

- Bufotenin
- Dimethyltryptamine-N-oxide
- 4-HO-AET
- 4-HO-NET
- 5-MeO-AMT
- 5-MeO-NMT
- Nebracetam
- 6-Hydroxy-DMT
- 7-Hydroxy-DMT
- Psilocin
