= Hallucinogenic snuff =

Form of psychoactive drugs

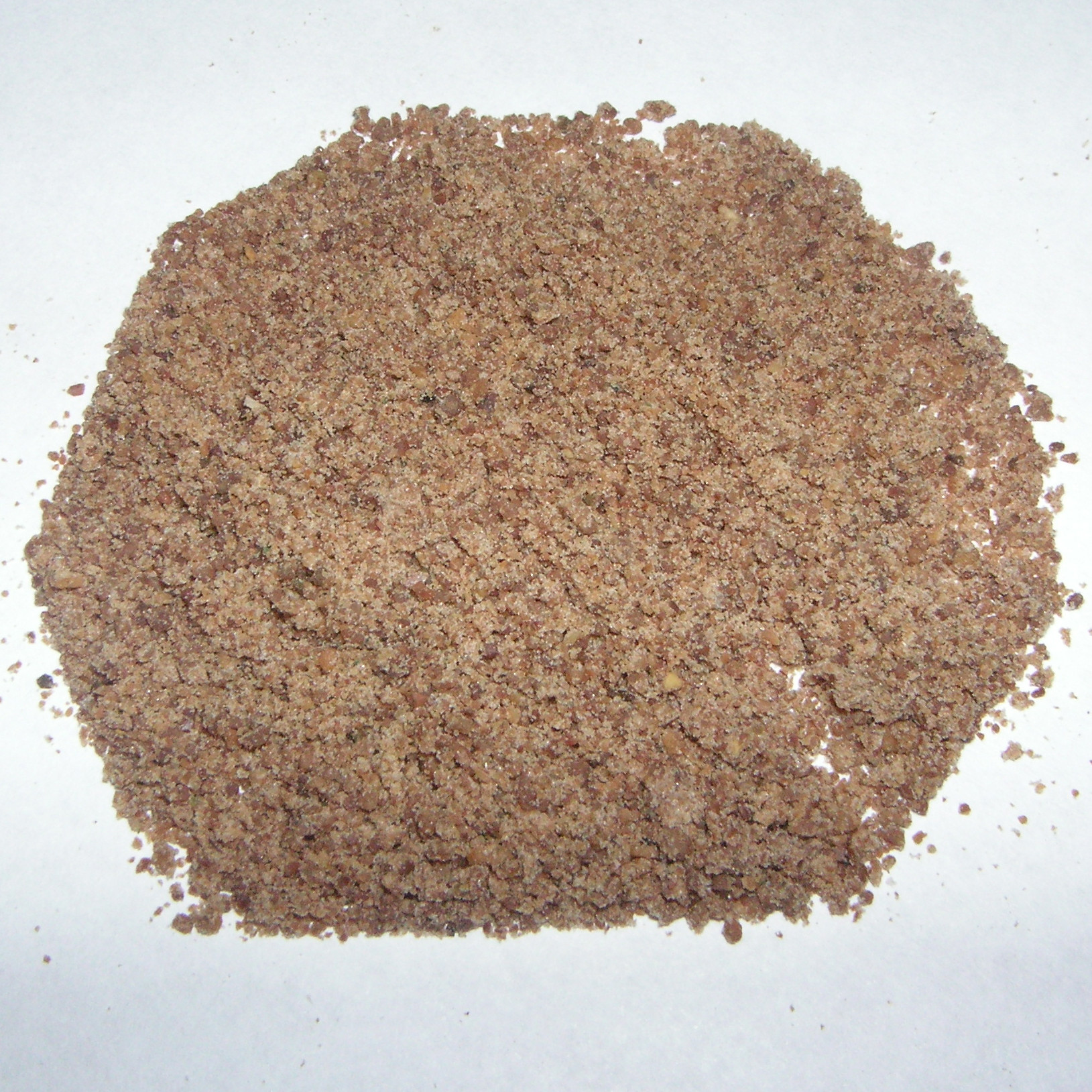
Modern yopo snuff, consisting of Anadenanthera peregrina seeds toasted, ground into powder, and mixed with 1/3 baking soda.

A hallucinogenic snuff, or psychedelic snuff, is a powder prepared from plants containing psychedelic alkaloids and insufflated (snorted) to produce hallucinogenic effects. Hallucinogenic snuffs have been used as entheogens by indigenous peoples of South and Central America for thousands of years. The snuffs are prepared most commonly from Anadenanthera species including Anadenanthera peregrina and Anadenanthera colubrina, but also from species of other genuses including Mimosa and Virola. They have local names including cohoba, ebene, paricá, yopo, cébil, and vilca, among many others. The active compounds in these snuffs include the serotonergic psychedelics bufotenin (5-HO-DMT), dimethyltryptamine (DMT), and 5-MeO-DMT. The materials of snuffs may also be used as enemas instead of via insufflation.

Although previously thought to be non-hallucinogenic and/or toxic, ethnobotanist Jonathan Ott and colleagues showed in 2001 that bufotenin is an active psychedelic similarly to DMT and 5-MeO-DMT and does not necessarily produce major adverse effects. Bufotenin is the only significant alkaloid present in the seeds of Anadenanthera species, from which many snuffs are prepared, with percentages of 2.7–12.4% bufotenin relative to 0.04–0.16% for 5-MeO-DMT and DMT. On the other hand, Virola theiodora contains up to 8% 5-MeO-DMT and lesser amounts of DMT. According to journalist Hamilton Morris, who has also self-experimented with bufotenin, the effects of pure bufotenin are like a cross between those of DMT and 5-MeO-DMT, though unlike the others it tends to be accompanied by severe nausea and vomiting. Morris has stated that, due to its use in the form of hallucinogenic snuffs, bufotenin may be the psychedelic with the longest known history of human entheogenic use. However, although bufotenin may be active as a hallucinogen, it can produce powerful and potentially dangerous cardiovascular side effects along with its emetic effects.

The use of hallucinogenic snuffs by indigenous South American people was first observed by Western explorers like Christopher Columbus as early as 1496. Bufotenin, DMT, and 5-MeO-DMT were first isolated from hallucinogenic snuffs in the 1950s and 1960s.

== See also ==
- Snuff tray
- Snuff spoon
- List of psychoactive plants
- List of substances used in rituals
- Entheogenic drugs and the archaeological record
- Hamilton's Pharmacopeia
- Brosimum acutifolium (takini)
- Ayahuasca
- Vinho de Jurema
- Colorado River toad
