= Anadenanthera peregrina var. peregrina =

Scientific classification
- Kingdom: Plantae
- Clade: Tracheophytes
- Clade: Angiosperms
- Clade: Eudicots
- Clade: Rosids
- Order: Fabales
- Family: Fabaceae
- Subfamily: Caesalpinioideae
- Clade: Mimosoid clade
- Genus: Anadenanthera
- Species: A. peregrina
- Variety: A. p. var. peregrina

Trinomial name
- Anadenanthera peregrina var. peregrina (L.)Speg.

Variety of legume

Anadenanthera peregrina var. peregrina is a tree in the family Fabaceae. It is native to Guyana, Venezuela, Brazil, Colombia and it is also found in the Caribbean.

== Entheogen ==
In South America, Anadenanthera peregrina var. peregrina is used to make nopolyopo, a shamanic snuff.

== Chemical components ==
Bufotenine is in the seeds.

This variety appears to be much higher in N,N-DMT than other types of Anadenanthera.

This strain is best for entheogenic use.
