= Snuff spoon =

Spoon used to insufflate powdered drugs

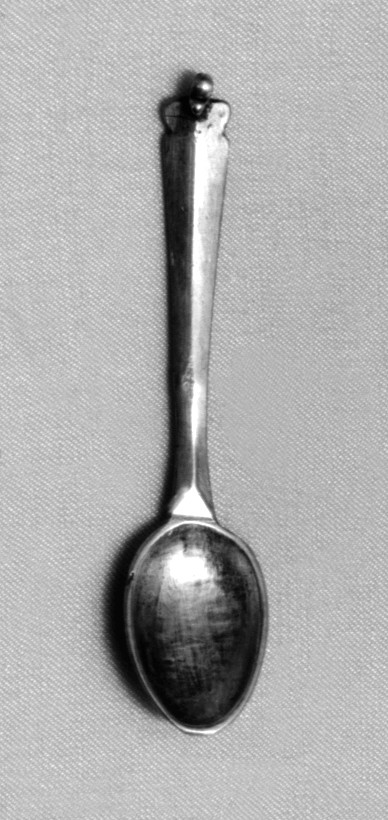
This silver snuff spoon originates from 18th century Germany, and is 4.8 centimetres in length.

A snuff spoon is a tiny spoon used for nasal insufflation of powdered substances. Historically, such spoons were used for psychotropic substances in pre-Columbian America, then tobacco in the 18th century, and cocaine in the 20th century, hence the names cocaine spoon and coke spoon. Some local statutes in the US treat spoons that are too small and thus "unsuited for the typical, lawful uses of a spoon" as drug paraphernalia.

Due to their small size, they are sometimes mistaken for toys. The designs of the snuff spoons closely followed that of the larger ones, and thus can be used to date the étuis containing them.

== History ==
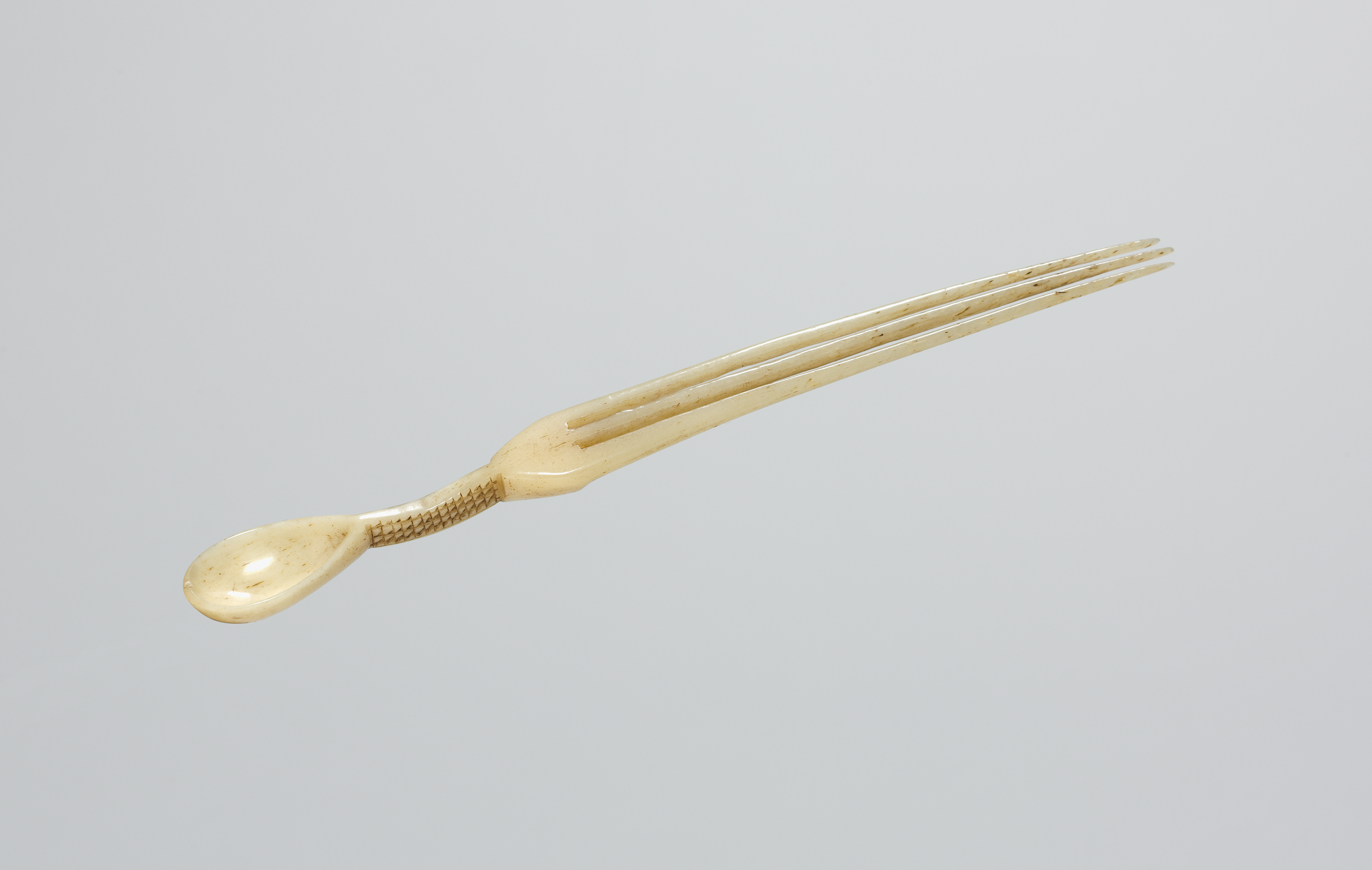
A Zulu snuff spoon/comb (ivory, 19th century)

Snuff spoons have been found at Chavín de Huántar in Peru (presumably used for consumption of hallucinogenic snuffs of Anadenanthera colubrina more than 2000 years ago), as well as in South Africa, where a combination of a tiny comb and a little spoon had made some researchers to assume that the spoon was used as an earpick or head-scratcher.

In England, powdered snuff appeared at the end of the 17th century, and quickly became popular along with the devices for its consumption. The user extracted the snuff with the spoon in the right hand, placed the substance onto the back side of the left hand, and sniffed from there. The combination of a little vial and a snuff spoon that acted like a stopper was a precursor of the snuff-box. By the end of the 19th century the snuff spoons went completely out of use.

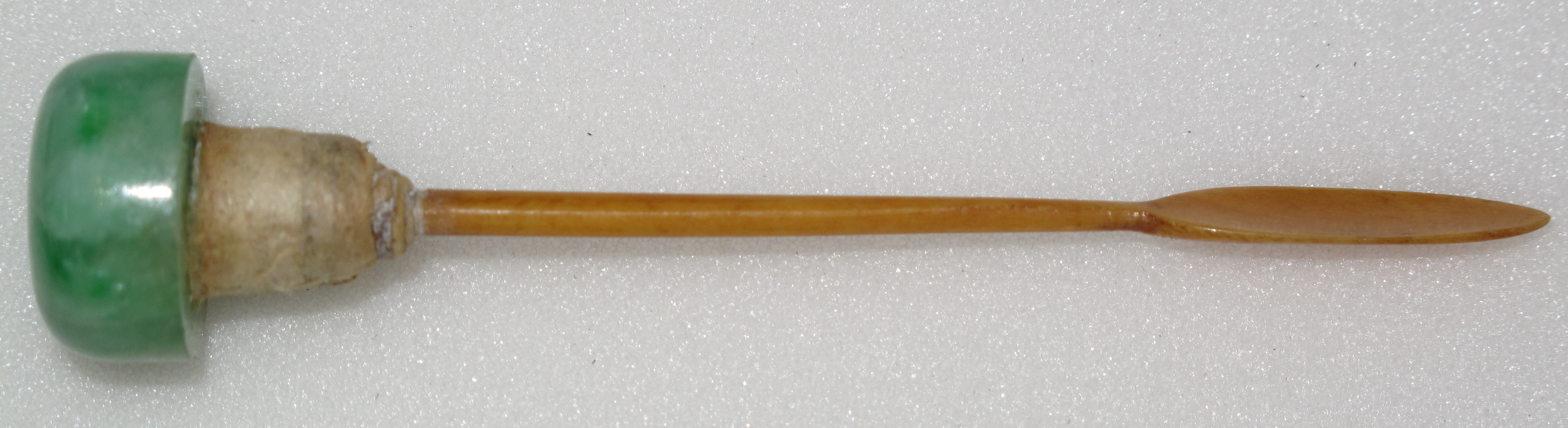
Chinese snuff bottle stopper with a spoon

In the US, McDonald's provides straight swizzle sticks to stir the coffee, while in the rest of the world a small plastic stirring spoon is used. According to Graybosch, this is rumored to be the case because the spoons can be used to snort cocaine.

== Sources ==
- Hopkins, Tighe (1897). "The Spoon". The Leisure Hour. Vol. 47. W. Stevens, printer. pp. 51–56. OCLC 145390810.
- Burger, Richard (December 2011). "What kind of hallucinogenic snuff was used at Chavín de Huántar? An iconographic identification". Ñawpa Pacha. 31 (2): 123–140. doi:10.1179/naw.2011.31.2.123. eISSN 2051-6207. ISSN 0077-6297. S2CID 191965354.
- Wild, R. P. (February 1939). "17. The Manufacture of a 'Ntiriba' Hairpin at Obuasi, Ashanti". Man. 39: 17–18. doi:10.2307/2793128. ISSN 0025-1496. JSTOR 2793128.
- Graybosch, Anthony J. (1 January 2004). "American Beauty". Deconstruction and Reconstruction. BrillL. pp. 91–101. doi:10.1163/9789004495876_013. ISBN 9789042016811.
- Childress, David Hatcher (2012). Ancient Technology in Peru & Bolivia. Adventures Unlimited Press. ISBN 978-1-935487-81-4. OCLC 788245749.
- Encyclopedia of Antiques and Collectibles (1983). "Snuff Box". The Official Encyclopedia of Antiques and Collectibles. House of Collectibles. p. 376. ISBN 978-0-87637-365-1. OCLC 9626297.
- Jackson, Charles James (1911). "The spoon and its history: Its form, material, and development". An Illustrated History of English Plate, Ecclesiastical and Secular: In which the Development of Form and Decoration in the Silver and Gold Work of the British Isles, from the Earliest Known Examples to the Latest of the Georgian Period, is Delineated and Described, Volume 2. "Country life," limited. pp. 470–537. OCLC 1074655150.
- Phipps, Frances (1974). "Snuff Box". The Collector's Complete Dictionary of American Antiques. Garden City, NY: Doubleday Books. p. 531. ISBN 0-385-03337-0.
