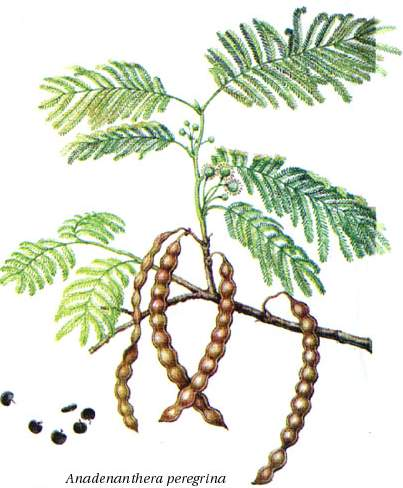

Scientific classification
- Kingdom: Plantae
- Clade: Tracheophytes
- Clade: Angiosperms
- Clade: Eudicots
- Clade: Rosids
- Order: Fabales
- Family: Fabaceae
- Subfamily: Caesalpinioideae
- Clade: Mimosoid clade
- Genus: Anadenanthera; Speg. Speg.

Species
- 2; see text

Synonyms
- Niopa (Benth.) Britton & Rose

= Anadenanthera =

Genus of plants

Anadenanthera is a genus of South American trees in the Legume family, Fabaceae. The genus contains two species, A. colubrina and A. peregrina. These trees are known to the western world primarily as sources of the hallucinogenic snuffs vilca/cebil and yopo/cohoba.

A 2024 molecular marker study of few hundred specimens sampled across Brazil and lowland Bolivia supports a four-species hypothesis (A. colubrina (Vell.) Brenan, A. macrocarpa (Benth.) Brenan, A. peregrina (L.) Speg., and A. falcata (Benth.) Speg) for the Anadenanthera genus as opposed to a two-species, four-variety hypothesis.

The main active constituent of Anadenanthera is bufotenin.

== Species ==
- Anadenanthera colubrina (Vell.) Brenan
  - Anadenanthera colubrina var. cebil
  - Anadenanthera colubrina var. colubrina
- Anadenanthera peregrina (L.) Speg.
  - Anadenanthera peregrina var. falcata
  - Anadenanthera peregrina var. peregrina

== Chemical compounds ==
Chemical compounds contained in Anadenanthera include:

- 5-Methoxy-N,N-dimethyltryptamine, bark
- Serotonin
- N-Methylserotonin
- 5-Methoxy-N-methyltryptamine, bark
- Bufotenin, seeds, bark
- Bufotenine N-oxide, seeds
- N,N-Dimethyltryptamine, seeds, pods, bark
- N,N-Dimethyltryptamine-N-oxide, Seeds
- N-Methyltryptamine, bark
- 2-Methyl-6-methoxy-1,2,3-tetrahydro-9H-pyrido[3,4-b]indole
- 2-Methyl-1,2,3,4-tetrahydro-9H-pyrido[3,4-b]indole
- 1,2-Dimethyl-6-methoxy-1,2,3,4-tetrahydro-9H-pyrido[3,4-b]indole
