= Anadenanthera colubrina var. cebil =

Scientific classification
- Kingdom: Plantae
- Clade: Tracheophytes
- Clade: Angiosperms
- Clade: Eudicots
- Clade: Rosids
- Order: Fabales
- Family: Fabaceae
- Subfamily: Caesalpinioideae
- Clade: Mimosoid clade
- Genus: Anadenanthera
- Species: A. colubrina
- Variety: A. c. var. cebil

Trinomial name
- Anadenanthera colubrina var. cebil (Griseb.) Altschul

Synonyms
- Acacia cebil Griseb.; Anadenanthera macrocarpa (Benth.) Brenan; Piptadenia cebil (Griseb.) Griseb.; Piptadenia hassleriana Chodat; Piptadenia hassleriana Chodat var. fruticosa Chodat & Hass; Piptadenia macrocarpa Benth.; Piptadenia macrocarpa Benth. var. cebil (Griseb.) Chodat & Hass; Piptadenia macrocarpa Benth. var. genuina Chodat & Hass; Piptadenia macrocarpa Benth. var. plurifoliata Hoehne; Piptadenia macrocarpa Benth. var. vestita Chodat & Hass; Piptadenia microphylla Benth.

Variety of legume

Anadenanthera colubrina var. cebil is a mimosa-like timber tree native to Caatinga and Cerrado vegetation in Argentina, Bolivia, Brazil, Paraguay and Peru. It has also been introduced to Mauritius. It grows up to 25 m (82 ft) tall, with a trunk diameter of 60–90 cm (24–35 in). The tree's mimosa-like leaves range in length from about 7–20 cm (2.8–7.9 in). The flowers are cream-colored and arrive in the spring. The seed pods are fairly straight and contain about 8 to 15 seeds each. The seeds are flat, average each about 1.5 cm (0.59 in) in diameter and have an average mass of about 0.125 g (0.0044 oz) each. The tree's wood has a density of about 840 kg/m^{3} (1,420 lb/cu yd).

== Uses ==
=== Gum ===
Gum from the tree can be used in the same way as gum arabic.

=== Honey ===
This tree is used as a honey plant.

=== Medicine ===
The tree is a medicinal plant. The bark is the most-used part of the tree for this. Small amounts of roasted, powdered seeds are snuffed for headaches and colds.

=== Ornamental tree ===
The tree is an ornamental plant, and it is especially useful as an urban tree.

=== Tannin ===
The tree's bark contains about 15.38% tannin. The seed pods contain 3% tannin and the heartwood contains 1.8%.

=== Wood ===
The wood is very hard and it dulls cutting tools. The heartwood is quite durable. The tree's wood is used for outdoor construction, marine applications, railroad ties and implement handles.

== Alkaloids ==
Bufotenin (5-HO-DMT) and dimethyltryptamine have been isolated from the seeds and seed pods, 5-HO-DMT from the bark of the stems.

== Conservation ==
A. colubrina var. cebil is sought after for its wood and bark (for medicinal purposes) and so it is being destructively cut down by industry. Since the tree is useful, calls are being made to plant trees near communities that use them, so that sustainable harvesting of the tree can be accomplished.

== Propagation ==
The seeds can be placed between a folded damp paper towel in a sealable plastic sandwich bag for a few days until the seeds sprout. They can then be planted 1 cm (0.39 in) deep in well-drained containers. Once watered, it is important to let the growing medium dry out well, before watering again.

== See also ==
- Anadenanthera colubrina
- List of honey plants
- List of plants of Caatinga vegetation of Brazil
- List of plants of Cerrado vegetation of Brazil
