= Cohoba =

Ceremony with inhaled ground cojóbana seeds

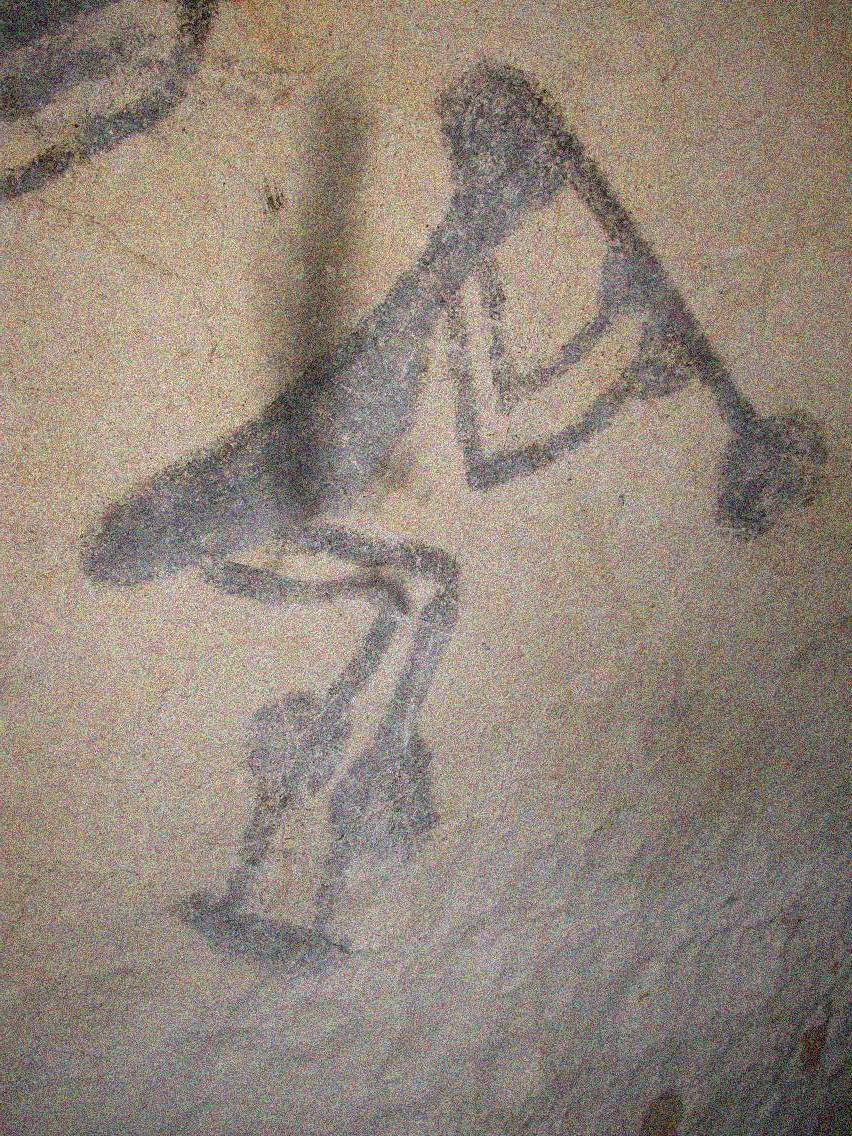
A pictograph depicting cohoba located in the Pomier Caves

Cohoba is a Taíno transliteration for a ceremony in which the ground seeds of the cojóbana tree (Anadenanthera spp.) were used as a snuff via a Y-shaped snuff tube. Use of this substance produced a visionary or entheogenic effect. The cojóbana tree is believed by some to be Anadenanthera peregrina although it may have been a generalized term for psychotropics, including the quite toxic Datura and related genera (Solanaceae). The corresponding ceremony using cohoba-laced tobacco is transliterated as cojibá. This was said to have produced the sense of a visionary journey of the kind associated with the practice of shamanism. Researchers have suggested that cohoba may also have been used by ritual specialists in healing practices, particularly for diagnosing illness through visionary experiences. Additional interpretations suggest that cohoba may also have functioned as an everyday stimulant and, in some cases, may have been incorporated into food preparations such as cassava, indicating a broader range of uses beyond strictly ceremonial or healing contexts.

The practice of snuffing cohoba was popular with the Taínos with whom Christopher Columbus made contact. However, the use of Anadenanthera powder was widespread in South America, being used in ancient times by the Wari culture and Tiwanaku of Peru and Bolivia, and also by the Piaroa of Venezuela and Colombia, and the Yanomami of Brazil and Venezuela. Other names for cohoba include vilca, cebíl, ñuá and yopó. In Tiwanaku culture, a snuff tray was used along with an inhalation tube.

Fernando Ortiz Fernández, the founder of Cuban Cultural Studies, offers a detailed analysis of the use of cohoba in his important anthropological work, Contrapunteo cubano del tabaco y el azúcar.

== History ==
Cohoba is also known as yopo. Historically, this narcotic snuff was prepared and used by the indigenous people living in South America and the natives of the Caribbean. Archaeological analysis of residues recovered from a grinding artifact at a precolonial habitation site in eastern Puerto Rico dated to approximately A.D. 1150–1250 identified starch grains consistent with Anadenanthera peregrina seeds, suggesting that cohoba powder was prepared locally. Early accounts of it first appeared during the time of Christopher Columbus's exploration, with its first documentation written in 1496 by Ramon Pane—who travelled with Columbus in the second voyage. The name of "cohoba" refers to the finely ground, cinnamon-colored snuff itself, as well as the ceremonial practice using it by South American tribes. Cuiva and Piaroa people of Orinocoan descent commonly consume Cohoba. As a part of important shamanistic rituals, cohoba represents identity and sociality.

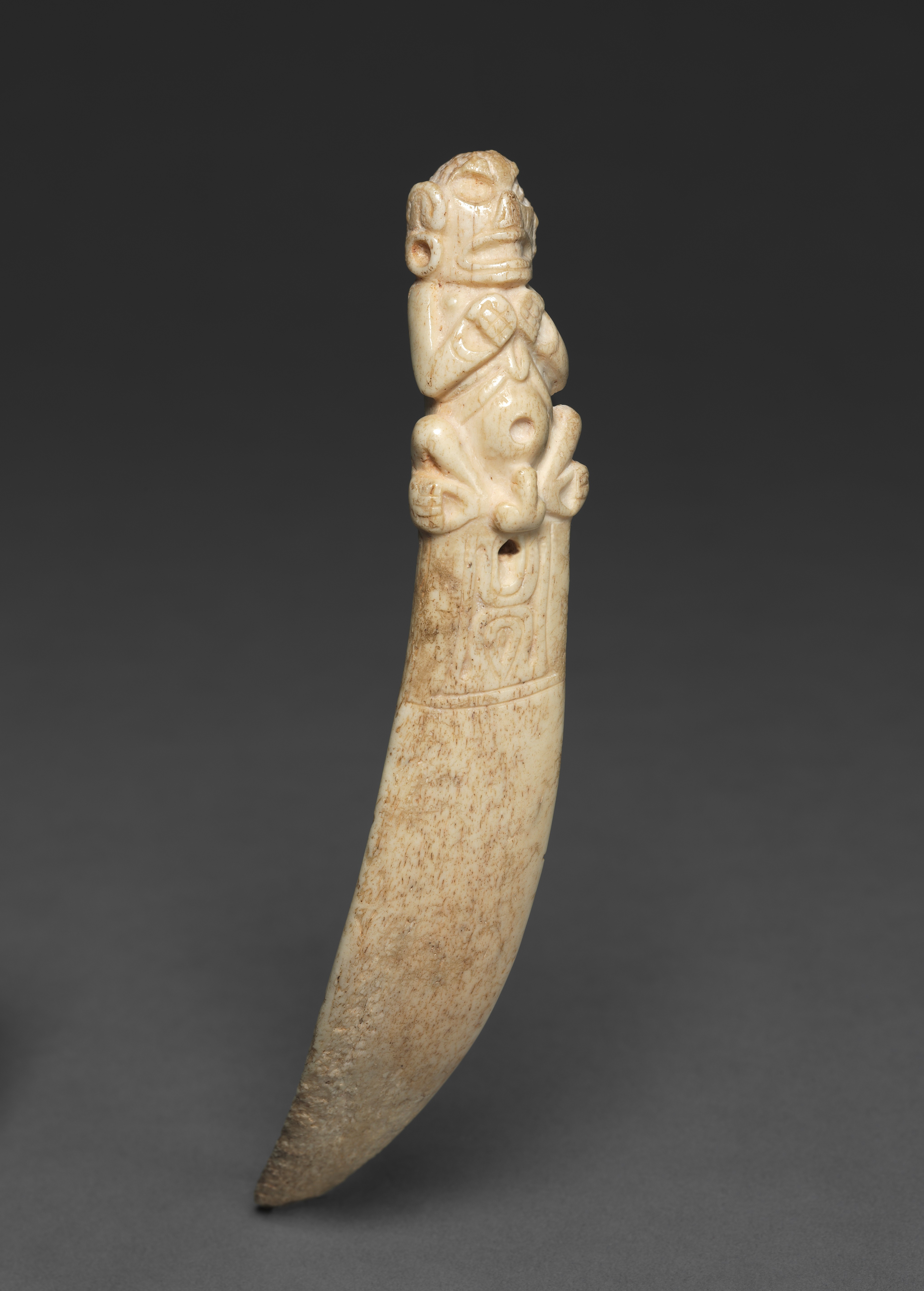
Carved spatulas were used to blend powdered herbs by Taíno

The blending step of the plant mixture determines the potency of cohoba, based on the quality of the ingredients and its preparation. Cohoba seeds are harvested once they mature, from October to February, such that cohoba can be prepared fresh by shamans throughout the year, when necessary. The bark of the cohoba tree is then collected, with its quality judged by the fineness and whiteness of the powdered ash after burning the bark. Meanwhile, the seeds of the cohoba plant are pulverized and skillfully blended with the powdered bark ash to create a dough resembling butter. A coral grinding artifact found in Puerto Rico indicates that cohoba seeds were ground using milling tools prior to being mixed with ash for ritual preparation. Once the desired texture is achieved, the dough is flattened into a cookie and cooked over a fire. Traditionally, yopo is taken by deep inhalation through bifurcated tubes from a special apparatus resembling a slightly deep, concave wooden plate.

== Symptoms ==
Though there are myriad somatic symptoms, ranging from violent sneezing to increased mucus production and bloodshot eyes, cohoba is appreciated for the altered, other-worldly state of consciousness it lends to the user. Even though cohoba is often snuffed with tobacco, it has pharmacologically intriguing properties distinct from tobacco. The active components in cohoba responsible for the hallucinogenic effects are DMT (N,N-dimethyltryptamine) and bufotenine (N,N-dimethyl-5-hydroxytryptamine). The effects of DMT include kaleidoscopic visions similar to LSD that may lead to scenery hallucinations, accompanied by auditory hallucinations. The psychotic effects derived from bufotenine have been suggested to have resulted from central nervous system activity. Though cohoba usage is not as widespread as before, it is still taken up today by various localities of South America for the aforementioned rich, hallucinogenic properties.

== See also ==
- Hallucinogenic snuff
- Bufotenin
