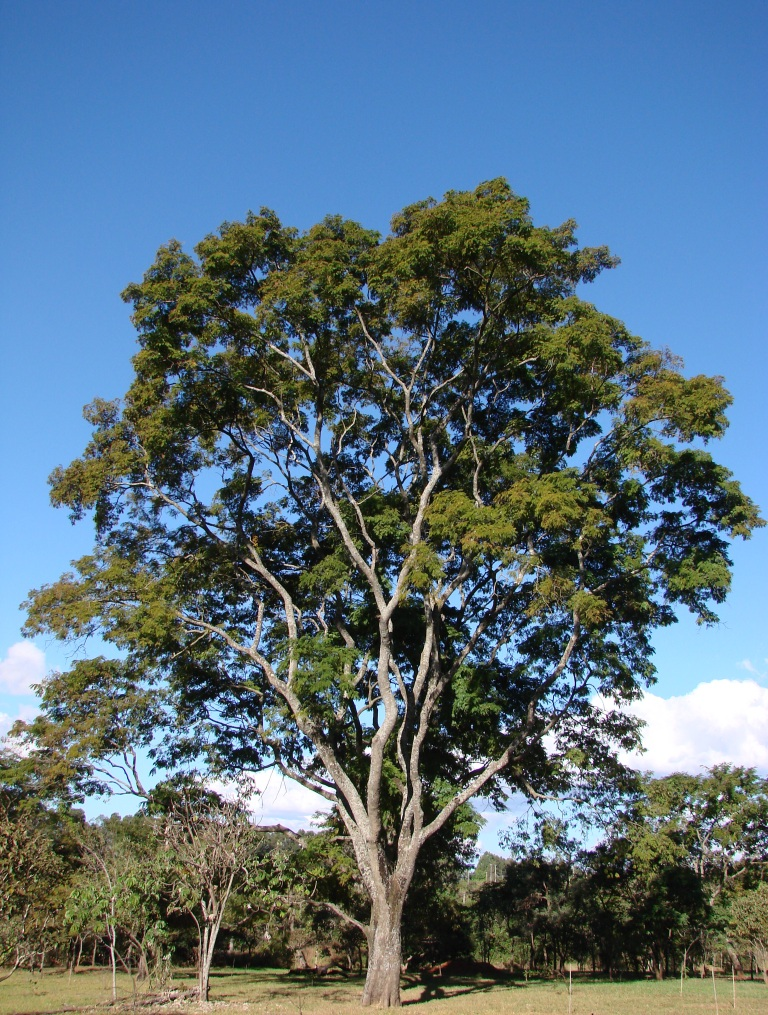

Conservation status
- Least Concern (IUCN 3.1)

Scientific classification
- Kingdom: Plantae
- Clade: Tracheophytes
- Clade: Angiosperms
- Clade: Eudicots
- Clade: Rosids
- Order: Fabales
- Family: Fabaceae
- Subfamily: Caesalpinioideae
- Clade: Mimosoid clade
- Genus: Anadenanthera
- Species: A. colubrina

Binomial name
- Anadenanthera colubrina (Vell.) Brenan
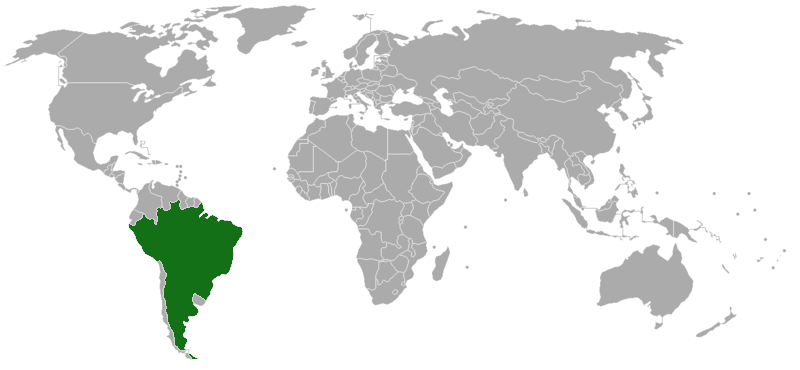
- Range of Anadenanthera colubrina

Synonyms
- Acacia colubrina Mart.; Acacia grata Willd.; Mimosa colubrina Vell.; Piptadenia grata (Willd.) J.F. Macbr.

= Anadenanthera colubrina =

Species of plant

Anadenanthera colubrina (also known as vilca, huilco, huilca, wilco, willka, curupay, curupau, cebil, or angico) is a South American tree closely related to yopo, or Anadenanthera peregrina. It grows to 5–20 m (16–66 ft) tall and the trunk is very thorny. The leaves are mimosa-like, up to 30 cm (12 in) in length and they fold up at night. In Argentina, A. colubrina produces flowers from September to December and bean pods from September to July. In Brazil A. colubrina has been given "high priority" conservation status.

== Nomenclature ==
Anadenanthera colubrina is known by many names throughout South America. In Peru it is known as willka (also spelled wilca, vilca and huilca) which in the Quechua languages means "grandchild."

== Geography ==
A. colubrina is found in Argentina, Bolivia, Brazil, Ecuador, Paraguay, Peru, Cuba, and Mauritius.

== Natural growing conditions ==
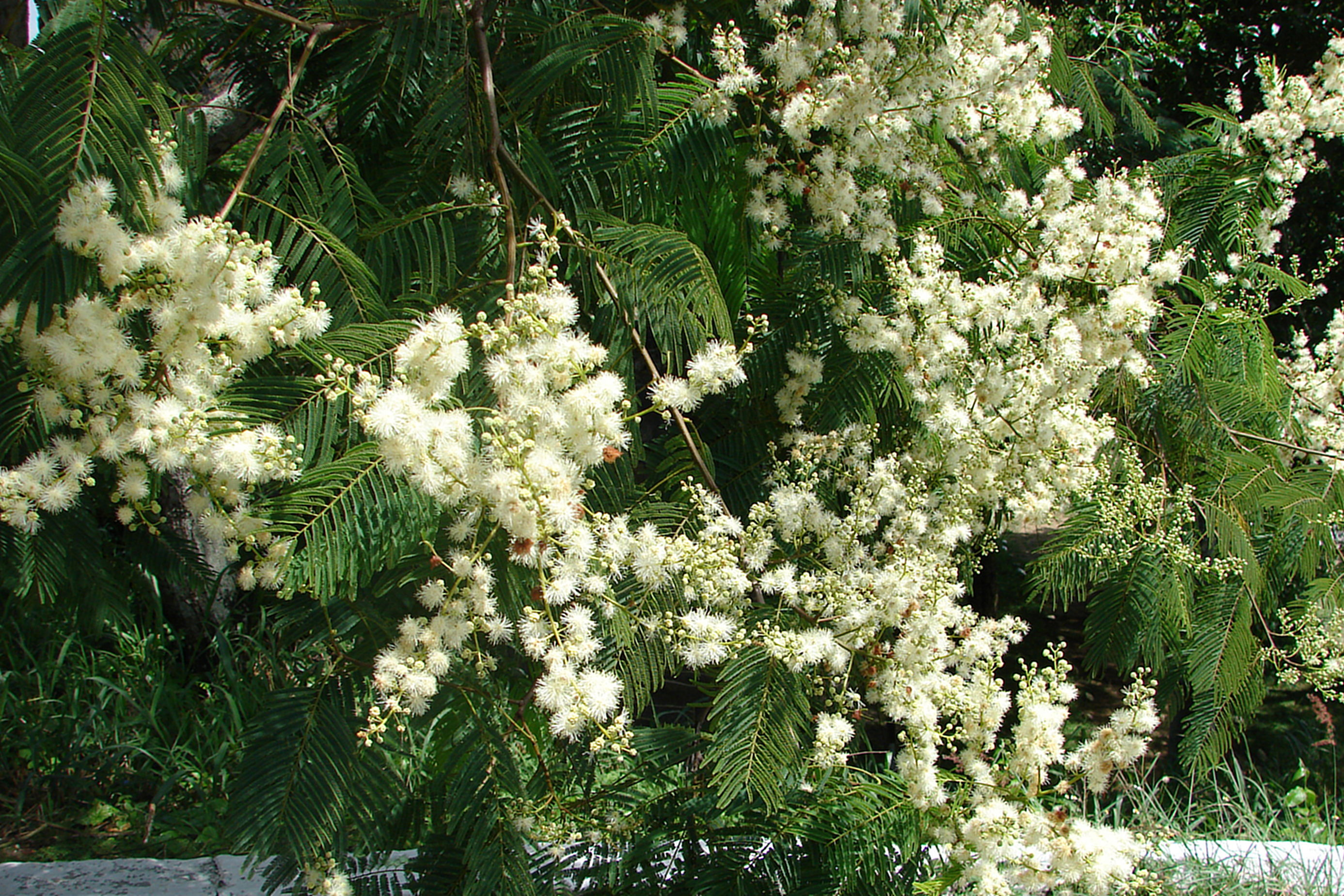
Anadenanthera colubrina flowers

A. colubrina grows at altitudes of about 315–2,200 m (1,033–7,218 ft) with roughly 25–60 cm (9.8–23.6 in) per year of precipitation and a mean temperature of 21 °C (70 °F). It tends to grow on rocky hillsides in well-drained soil, often in the vicinity of rivers. It grows quickly at 1–1.5 m (3 ft 3 in – 4 ft 11 in) per year in good conditions. The growing areas are often "savannah to dry rainforest." Flowering can begin in as soon as two years after germination.

== General uses ==
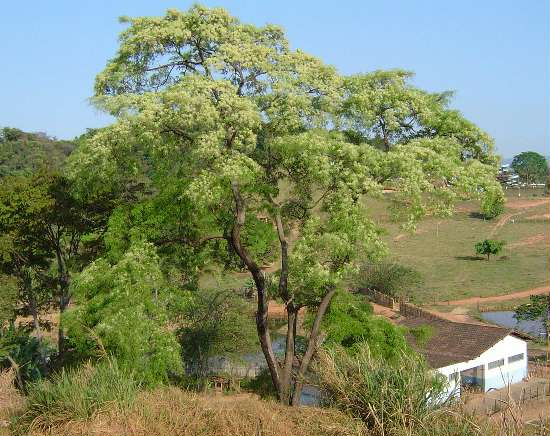
Anadenanthera colubrina

=== Food ===
A sweetened drink is made from the bark.

=== Gum ===
Gum from the tree can be used in the same way as gum arabic.

=== Tannin ===
A. colubrina's tannin is used in industry to process animal hides.

=== Hallucinogen ===
The beans of A. colubrina are used to make a hallucinogenic snuff called vilca (sometimes called cebil). The bean pods are roasted to facilitate removal of the husk, followed by grinding with a mortar and pestle into a powder and mixed with a natural form of calcium hydroxide (lime) or calcium oxide. The main active constituent of vilca is bufotenin. A. colubrina has been found to contain up to 12.4% bufotenin.

It is also believed that the ground beans were used as a snuff by the Tiwanaku. There have been reports of active use of vilca by Wichi shamans, under the name hatáj.

Between 2013 and 2017, archaeological excavations at the Quilcapampa site in southern Peru, found that the Wari used seeds from the vilca tree and combined the hallucinogenic drug with chicha, or beer made from the molle tree.

Archaeological evidence shows Anadenanthera colubrina beans have been used as hallucinogens for thousands of years. The oldest clear evidence of use comes from pipes made of puma bone (Felis concolor) found with A. colubrina beans at Inca Cueva, a site in the Humahuaca gorge at the edge of the Puna of Jujuy Province, Argentina. The pipes were found to contain the hallucinogen DMT, one of the compounds found in Anadenanthera beans. Radiocarbon testing of the material gave a date of 2130 BC, suggesting that Anadenanthera use as a hallucinogen is over 4,000 years old. Snuff trays and tubes were found in the central Peruvian coast dating back to 1200 BC. Archaeological evidence of insufflation use within the period 500-1000 AD, in northern Chile, has been reported.

=== Traditional medicine ===
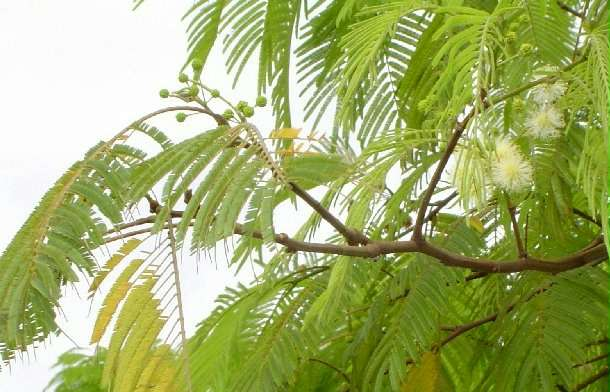
Anadenanthera colubrina foliage and flowers.

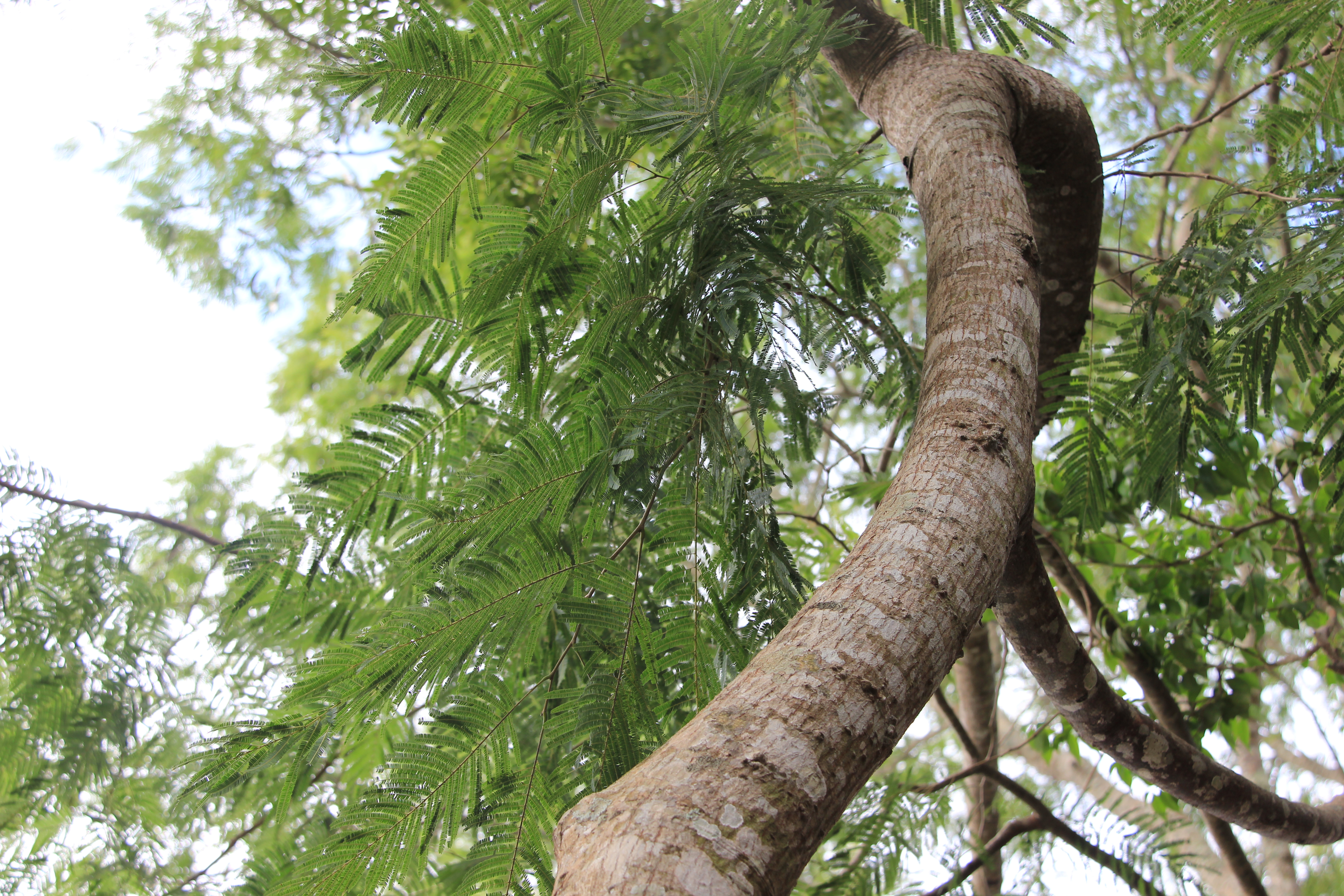
Anadenanthera colubrina leaves and bark at Iguazu Falls.

The tree's bark is the most common part used medicinally. Gum from the tree is used medicinally to treat upper respiratory tract infections, as an expectorant and otherwise for cough.

=== Wood ===
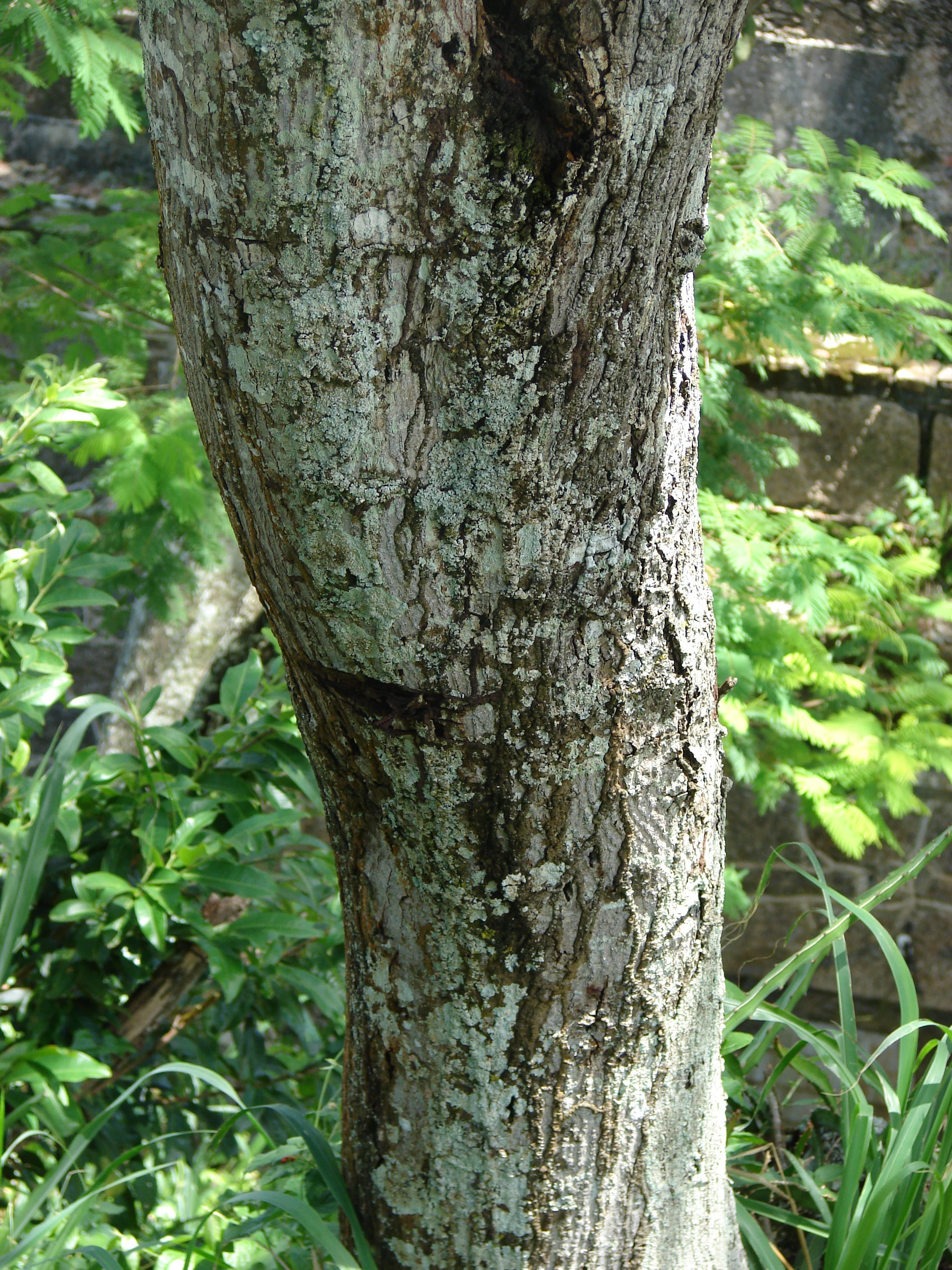
Anadenanthera colubrina trunk

In northeastern Brazil, the tree is primarily used as timber and for making wooden implements. "It is used in construction and for making door and window frames, barrels, mooring masts, hedges, platforms, floors, agricultural implements and railway sleepers." The wood is also reportedly a preferred source of cooking fuel, since it makes a hot and long-lasting fire. It is widely used there in the making of fences, since termites seem not to like it. At one time, it was used in the construction of houses, but people are finding it more difficult to find suitable trees for that purpose.

== Chemical compounds ==
Chemical compounds contained in A. colubrina include:

- 2,9-dimethyltryptoline – plant
- 2-methyltryptoline – plant
- 5-MeO-DMT – bark
- 5-Methoxy-N-methyltryptamine – bark
- Bufotenin – plant beans
- Bufotenin-oxide – fruit, beans
- Catechol – plant
- Leucoanthocyanin – plant
- Leucopelargonidol – plant
- DMT – fruit, beans, pods, bark
- DMT-oxide – fruit
- Methyltryptamine – bark
- Orientin – leaf
- Saponarentin – leaf
- Viterine – leaf

The bark and leaves contain tannin and the beans contain saponin.

== Botanical varieties ==
- Anadenanthera colubrina (Vell.Conc.)Brenan var. cebil (Griseb.)Altschul
- Anadenanthera colubrina (Vell.Conc.)Brenan var. colubrina
