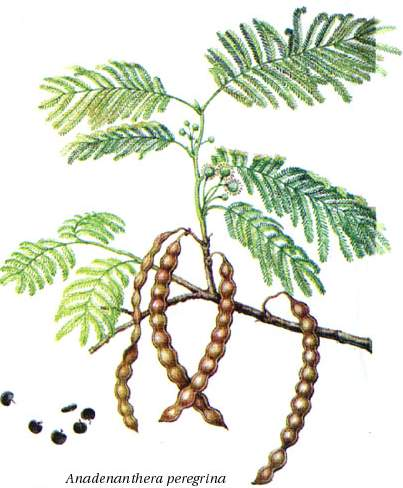

Conservation status
- Least Concern (IUCN 3.1)

Scientific classification
- Kingdom: Plantae
- Clade: Tracheophytes
- Clade: Angiosperms
- Clade: Eudicots
- Clade: Rosids
- Order: Fabales
- Family: Fabaceae
- Subfamily: Caesalpinioideae
- Clade: Mimosoid clade
- Genus: Anadenanthera
- Species: A. peregrina

Binomial name
- Anadenanthera peregrina (L.) Speg.
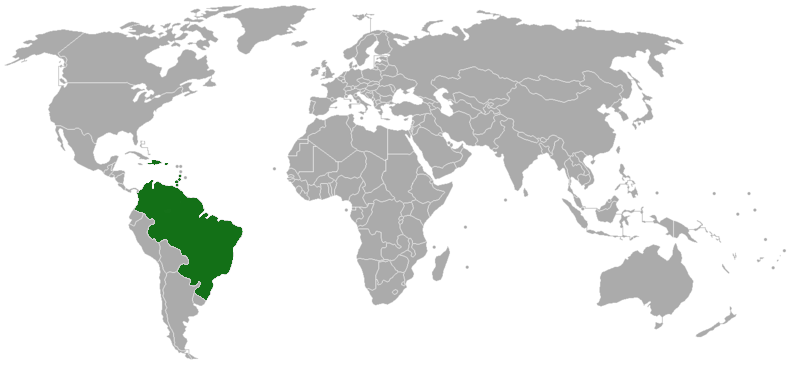
- Range of Anadenanthera peregrina

Synonyms
- Acacia angustiloba DC. Acacia microphylla Willd. Acacia peregrina (L.) Willd. Inga niopo Willd. Mimosa acacioides Benth. Mimosa niopo (Willd.) Poir. Mimosa parvifolia Poiret; Mimosa peregrina L. Niopa peregrina (L.) Britton & Rose; Piptadenia niopo (Willd.) Spruce; Piptadenia peregrina (L.) Benth.

= Anadenanthera peregrina =

Species of plant

Anadenanthera peregrina, also known as yopo, jopo, cohoba, cojoba, parica or calcium tree, is a perennial tree in the family Fabaceae native to the Caribbean and South America. It grows up to 20 m (70 ft) tall, and has a thorny bark. Its flowers grow in small, pale yellow to white spherical clusters resembling Acacia (e.g. wattle) inflorescences. It is an entheogen which has been used in healing ceremonies and rituals for thousands of years in northern South America and the Caribbean. Although the seeds of the yopo tree were originally gathered from the wild, increased competition between tribes over access to the seeds led to it being intentionally cultivated and transported elsewhere.

== Related species ==
This plant is almost identical to that of a related tree, Anadenanthera colubrina, commonly known as cebíl or vilca. The beans of A. colubrina have a similar chemical makeup as Anadenanthera peregrina, with their primary constituent being bufotenin.

== Botanical varieties ==
- Anadenanthera peregrina var. falcata
- Anadenanthera peregrina var. peregrina

== Uses ==
=== Wood ===
The wood from A. peregrina produces very hard timber that is used for making furniture. It has a density of around 0.86 g/cm^{3}. Tannins have also been derived from this plant.

=== Toxicity ===
The beans (sometimes called seeds) and falling leaves are hallucinogenic and are toxic to cattle.

== Chemical compounds ==
Chemical compounds contained in A. peregrina include:

- 2,9-dimethyltryptoline – plant
- 2-methyltryptoline – plant
- 5-MeO-DMT – bark, beans
- 5-Methoxy-N-methyltryptamine – bark
- Bufotenin – plant beans
- Bufotenin-oxide – fruit, beans
- Catechol – plant
- Leucoanthocyanin – plant
- Leucopelargonidol – plant
- DMT – fruit, beans, pods, bark
- DMT-oxide – fruit
- N-Methyltryptamine – bark
- Orientin – leaf
- Saponarentin – leaf
- Viterine – leaf

The bark contains a high percentage of tannins, 587 mg CE/g extract.

== Entheogenic uses ==
=== Traditional usage ===
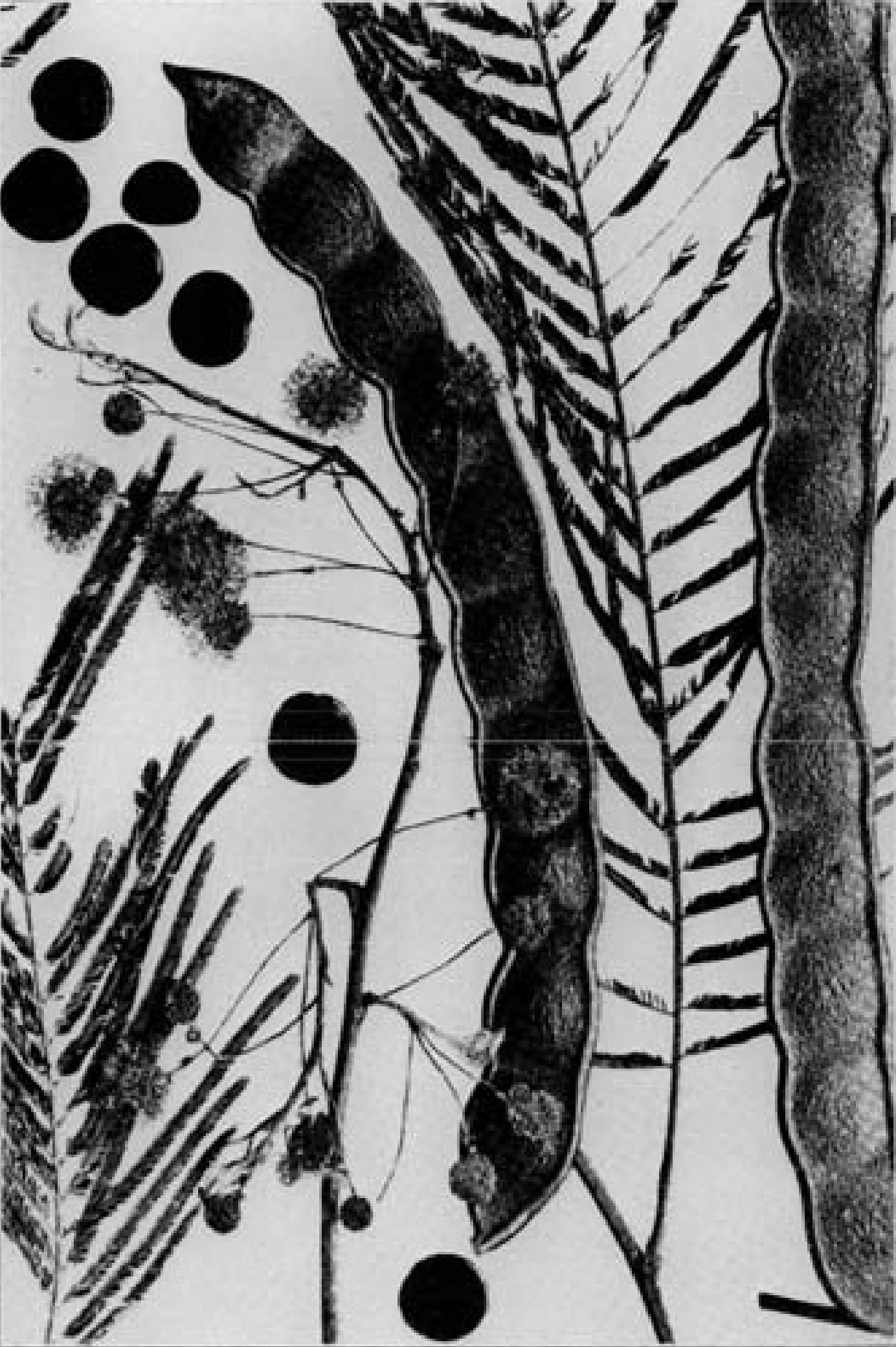
Anadenanthera peregrina 1916

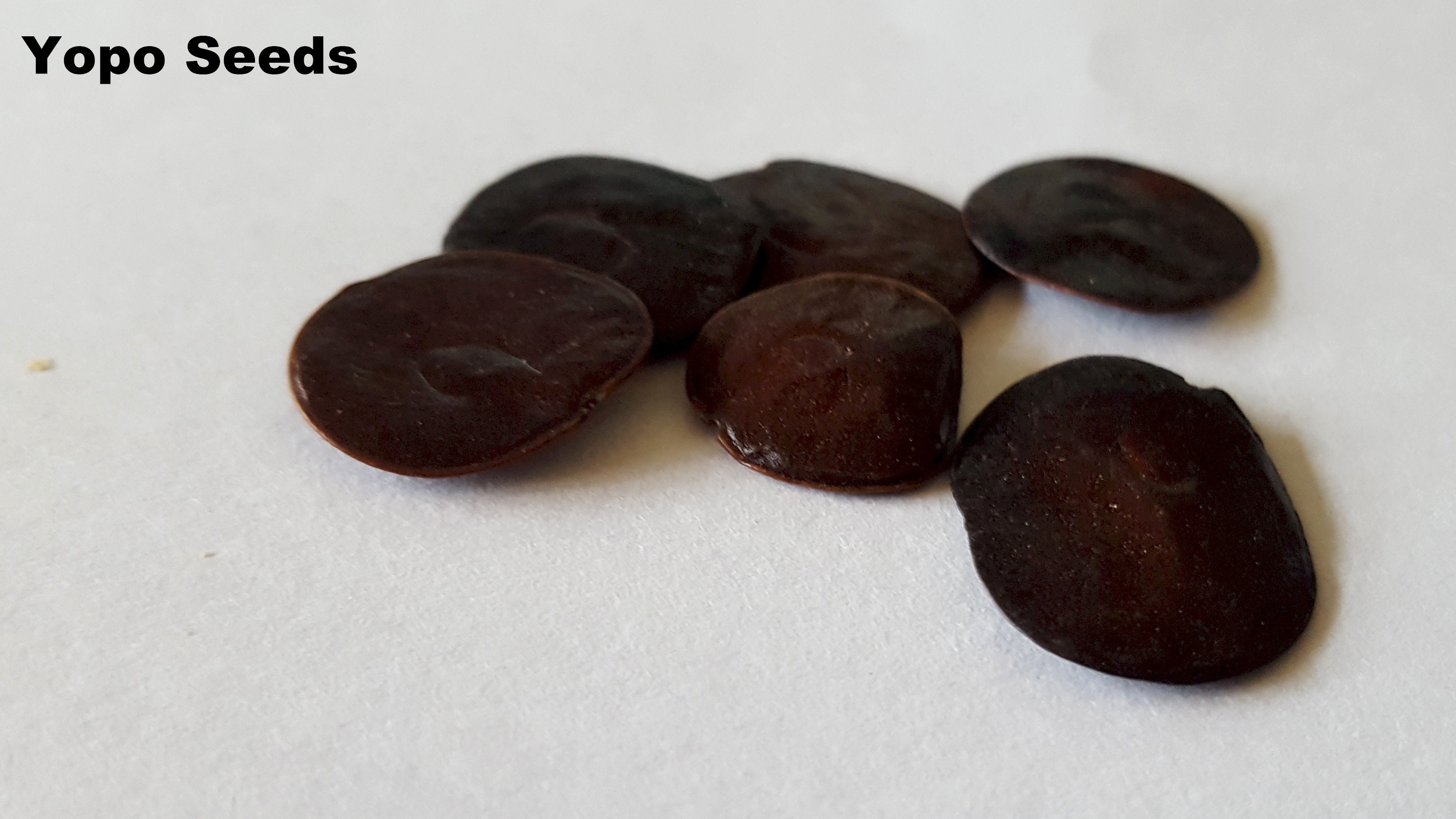
Yopo seeds

Archaeological evidence shows Anadenanthera beans have been used as hallucinogens for thousands of years. The oldest clear evidence of use comes from pipes made of puma bone (Puma concolor) found with Anadenanthera beans presumably of the sister species A. colubrina, at Inca Cueva, a site in the Humahuaca gorge at the edge of the Puna of Jujuy Province, Argentina. The pipes were found to contain the hallucinogen DMT, one of the compounds found in Anadenanthera beans. Radiocarbon testing of the material gave a date of 2130 BC, suggesting that Anadenanthera use as a hallucinogen is over 4,000 years old. Additionally, evidence from eastern Puerto Rico indicates that cojoba seeds were ground using coral milling tools in contexts dated to A.D. 1150–1250, providing the first direct evidence of cojoba processing in the West Indies. Snuff trays and tubes similar to those commonly used for yopo were found in the central Peruvian coast dating back to 1200 BC, suggesting that insufflation of Anadenanthera beans is a more recent method of use. Archaeological evidence of insufflation use within the period 500-1000 AD, in northern Chile, has been reported.

Some Indigenous peoples of the Orinoco basin in Colombia, Venezuela, and Brazil prepare yopo snuff for ritual and healing purposes. Among the Piaroa of the Venezuelan Orinoco, yopo is reserved primarily for shamanic specialists known as meñeruá. These shamans use yopo in visionary rituals to diagnose illness, mediate with spiritual beings, and access ancestral knowledge encoded in myth and cosmology. The yopo experience is considered essential to shaping future realities and maintaining the ethical balance between human and non-human worlds.

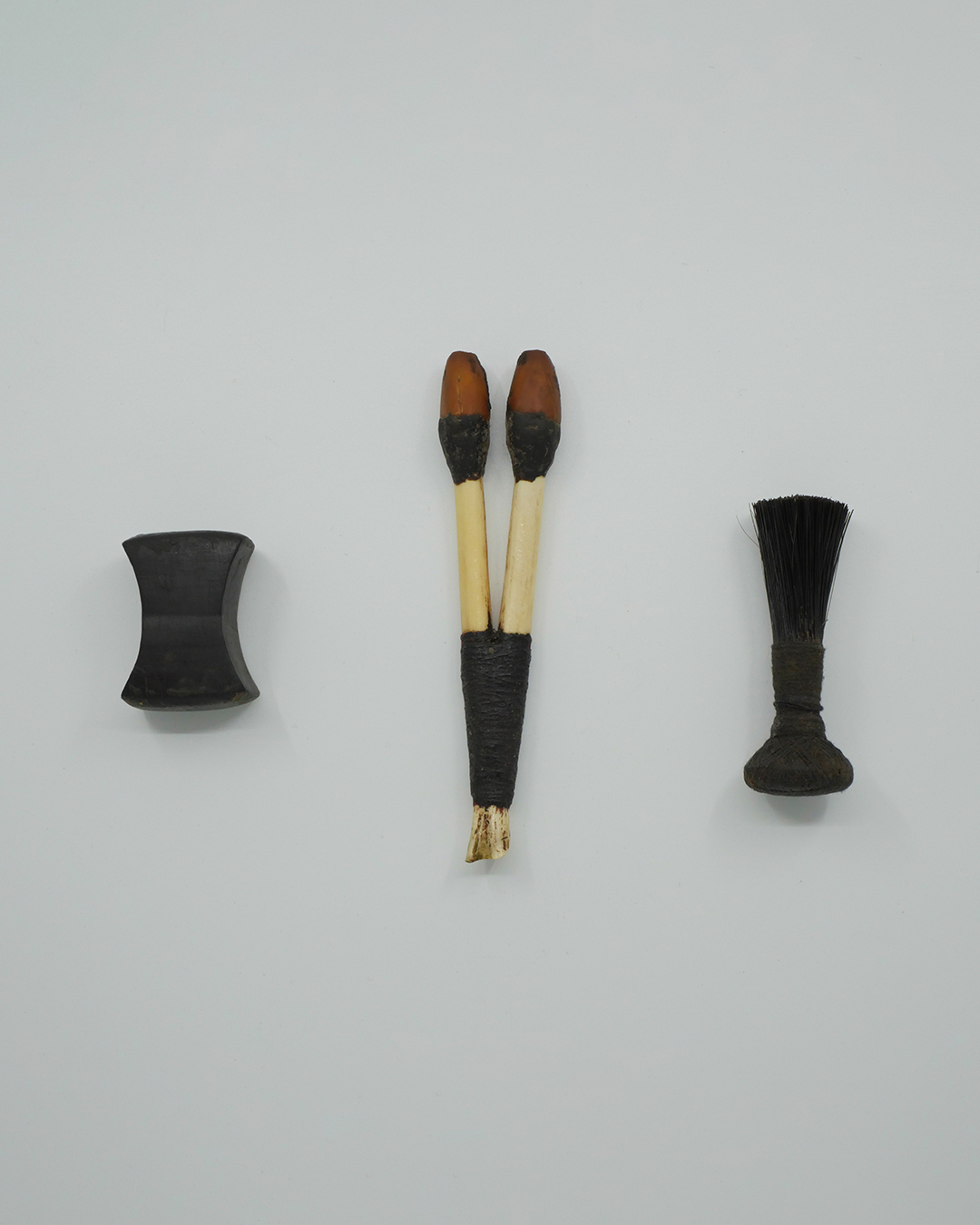
Piaroa yopo instruments, bird bones tubes for sniffing, brush and masher.

Yopo snuff is usually blown into the user's nostrils by another person through bamboo tubes or sometimes snuffed by the user using bird bone tubes. In some areas the unprocessed ground beans are snuffed or smoked producing a much weaker effect with stronger physical symptoms. Some tribes as Piaroas, also prepare yopo by integrating cuttings of Banisteriopsis caapi (capi), and they may ingest capi decoctions or chew its inner bark shortly before inhaling yopo, with the intention of prolonging and intensifying the visionary experience.

=== Effects ===
The first report of the effects of hallucinogenic snuff prepared from the beans of Anadenanthera peregrina dates back to 1496 when it was observed by Friar Ramon Pane, who was commissioned by Christopher Columbus, among the Taino Indians of Hispaniola. Pane's report was first published in 1511 in Martyr's descriptions of the New World. The description of its effects reads in part: "This kohobba powder," described as "an intoxicating herb, is so strong that those who take it lose consciousness; when the stupefying action begins to wane, the arms and legs become loose and the head droops." It is administered with a cane about one foot long of which they introduce one end "in the nose and the other in the powder and ...draw it into themselves through the nose". It worked quickly: "almost immediately they believe they see the room turn upside-down and men walking with their heads downwards". The administering witch-doctor took the drug along with his patients, intoxicating "them so that they do not know what they do and ... speak of many things incoherently", believing that they are in communication with spirits.

=== Active constituents ===
==== Bufotenin ====
The beans have been found to contain up to 7.4% bufotenin. At up to 7.4% (74 mg per gram) bufotenin, an effective 40 mg dose of insufflated bufotenin requires little more than 0.5 grams of beans.

The intraperitoneal LD_{50} of bufotenin is between 200 and 300 mg/kg (in rodents) with death occurring by respiratory arrest. Human intravenous tests using bufotenin suggest the LD_{50} may be much lower in humans with subjects showing signs of peripheral toxicity (purple face, tachycardia, difficulty breathing, etc.) at doses as little as 8 mg in some subjects. Free base bufotenin when insufflated, taken sublingually, orally, or intrarectally, elicits strong hallucinogenic effects with far less side effects.

==== Dimethyltryptamine and 5-MeO-DMT ====
The beans have been found to contain up to only 0.04% 5-MeO-DMT and 0.16% DMT. The leaves and bark also contain small amounts of DMT, 5-MeO-DMT and related compounds.

At up to 0.04% (0.4 mg per gram) 5-MeO-DMT, an effective light 5 mg dose of insufflated 5-MeO-DMT would require over 12 grams of beans. It would be extremely difficult to insufflate such a quantity, as tolerance would likely develop before the 12-gram nasal intake could be completed. Individual sensitivity to 5-MeO-DMT varies. It has been documented that the threshold dose in some individuals is as much as 10 mg insufflated requiring over 24 grams of beans for an effective dose of 5-MeO-DMT.

At up to 0.16% (1.6 mg per gram) DMT, an effective 40 mg dose of insufflated DMT would require 25 grams or more. Because of its volume, it's likely to be impossible to insufflate the 25 grams of beans required to reach the active dose of DMT present in the beans. An extract of 25 grams of beans could contain up to 1,850 mg of bufotenin, a potentially dangerous dose. With insufflated freebase bufotenin, the maximum published safe dose used has been 100 mg.

Unlike bufotenin, both DMT and 5-MeO-DMT are relatively unstable and begin to degrade rather quickly. Schultes and colleges (1977) examined a 120-year-old bean collection and found 0.6% bufotenin with no DMT or 5-MeO-DMT present at all. They also examined a batch of beans that contained all three compounds when fresh, but found only bufotenin in the beans after only two years of storage.

=== Oral usage ===
When taken orally by some tribes in South America, small amounts are often combined with alcoholic chichas (maize beer). Moderate doses are unpleasant, producing nausea and vomiting. The beans were a main ingredient in bilca tauri, an oral purge medicine used to induce ritual vomiting once a month. Large amounts are not usually consumed orally as many tribes believe oral use is dangerous.

=== Use with MAOIs ===
Some South American tribes have been documented to use various bean preparations along with Banisteriopsis caapi, an herb containing monoamine oxidase inhibitors (MAOIs). Typically Banisteriopsis caapi is chewed in the mouth while the Anadenanthera beans are snuffed or smoked. Occasionally Banisteriopsis caapi is found mixed in with the snuff.

== See also ==
- Anadenanthera colubrina
- Cohoba
- List of plants of Caatinga vegetation of Brazil
- Nu-nu, a psychotropic snuff used by Matsés people
- Psychedelic plants
