= Anadenanthera colubrina var. colubrina =

Scientific classification
- Kingdom: Plantae
- Clade: Tracheophytes
- Clade: Angiosperms
- Clade: Eudicots
- Clade: Rosids
- Order: Fabales
- Family: Fabaceae
- Subfamily: Caesalpinioideae
- Clade: Mimosoid clade
- Genus: Anadenanthera
- Species: A. colubrina
- Variety: A. c. var. colubrina

Trinomial name
- Anadenanthera colubrina var. colubrina (Griseb.) Altschul

Synonyms
- Piptadenia colubrina (Vell.) Benth.

Variety of legume

Anadenanthera colubrina var. colubrina is a tree native to Argentina and Brazil. Common names for it include Angico, Angico-brabo-liso, Angico-cambui, Angico-coco, Angico-escuro, Angico-liso, Angico-vermelho, Aperta-ruao and Cambui-angico.

== Growth ==
Anadenanthera colubrina var. colubrina normally grows to a height of about 10–20 m, but occasionally it will be seen up to 30 m tall. It can be found growing at an altitude of 100–1200 m in areas with 1200–2000 mm/year annual rainfall.

The tree's bark has a thickness of about 4–10 mm. The outside surface is nearly smooth. It is gray, black speckled and resembles snake skin, after which it was once given a scientific designation.

== Uses ==
The wood is hard to very hard and it has a density of 0.80-1.10 g/cm^{3}. It is used for firewood, charcoal, floors, beams, posts, stakes, boat construction and general construction.
