= Anadenanthera peregrina var. falcata =

Scientific classification
- Kingdom: Plantae
- Clade: Tracheophytes
- Clade: Angiosperms
- Clade: Eudicots
- Clade: Rosids
- Order: Fabales
- Family: Fabaceae
- Subfamily: Caesalpinioideae
- Clade: Mimosoid clade
- Genus: Anadenanthera
- Species: A. peregrina
- Variety: A. p. var. falcata

Trinomial name
- Anadenanthera peregrina var. falcata (Benth.) Altschul
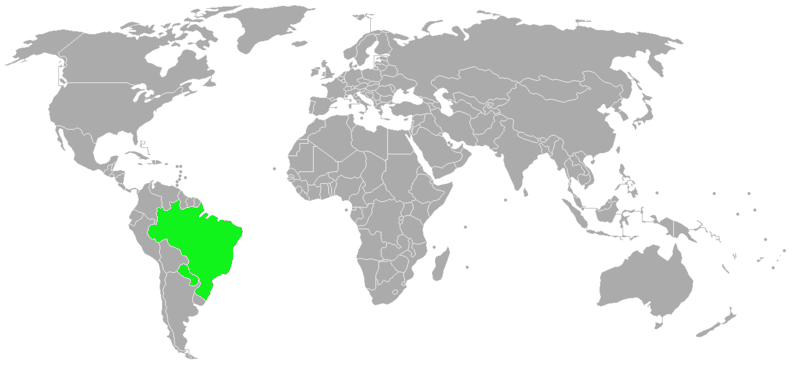
- Range of Anadenanthera peregrina var. falcata

Synonyms
- Anadenanthera falcata (Benth.) Speg.; Piptadenia falcata Benth.; Piptadenia peregrina (L.) Benth. var. falcata (Benth.) Chodat & Hassl.

Variety of legume

Anadenanthera peregrina var. falcata is a timber tree native to Paraguay and Cerrado vegetation in Brazil, specially in Mato Grosso, Mato Grosso do Sul, Minas Gerais, and São Paulo. A pioneer species of relative high establishment and growth rates, this plant is also used as an ornamental.

A 2024 molecular marker study of few hundred specimens sampled across Brazil and lowland Bolivia supports a four-species hypothesis (A. colubrina (Vell.) Brenan, A. macrocarpa (Benth.) Brenan, A. peregrina (L.) Speg., and A. falcata (Benth.) Speg) for the Anadenanthera genus as opposed to a two-species, four-variety hypothesis.

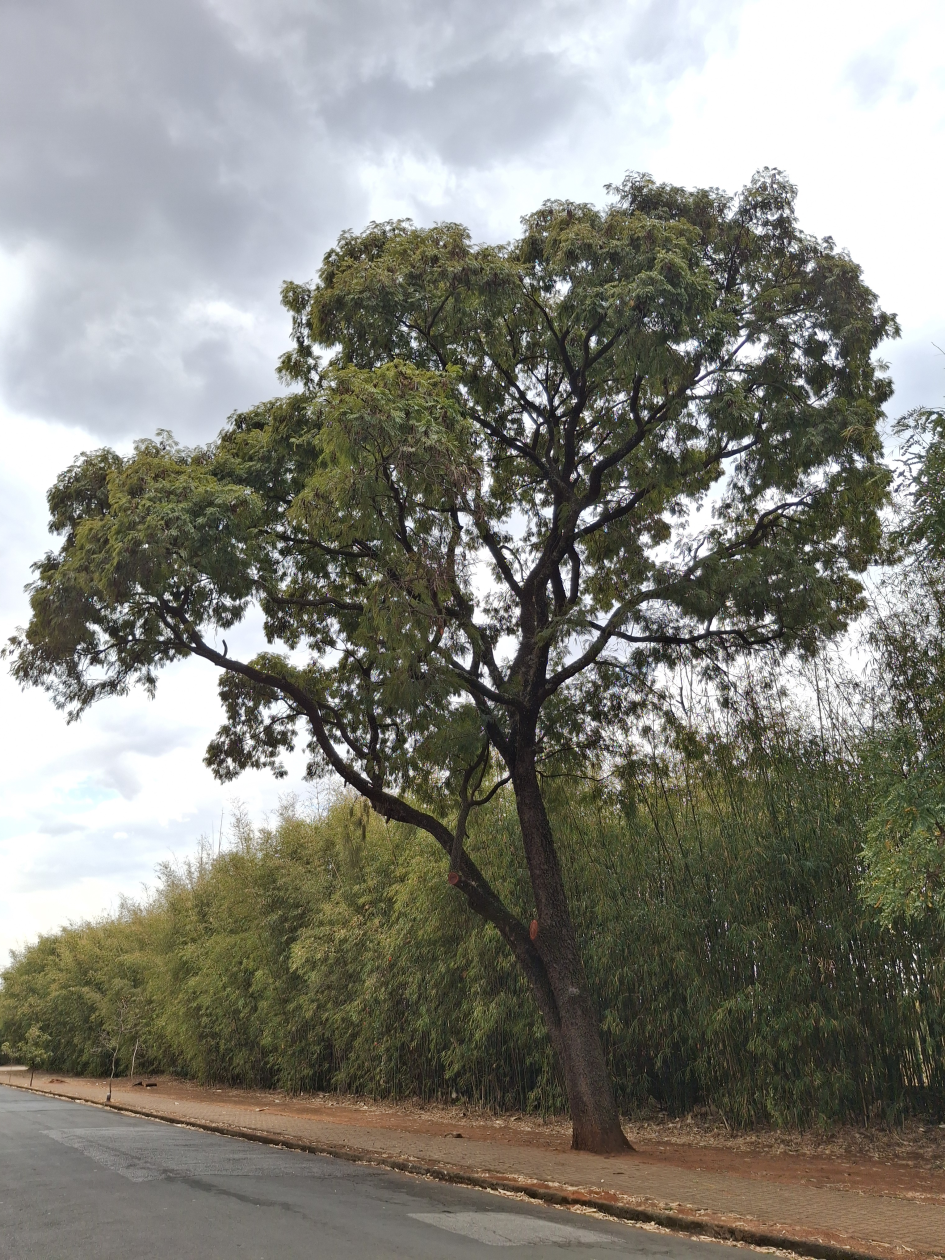
Anadenanthera peregrina var. falcata specimen in the Barão Geraldo district, Campinas, SP, Brazil

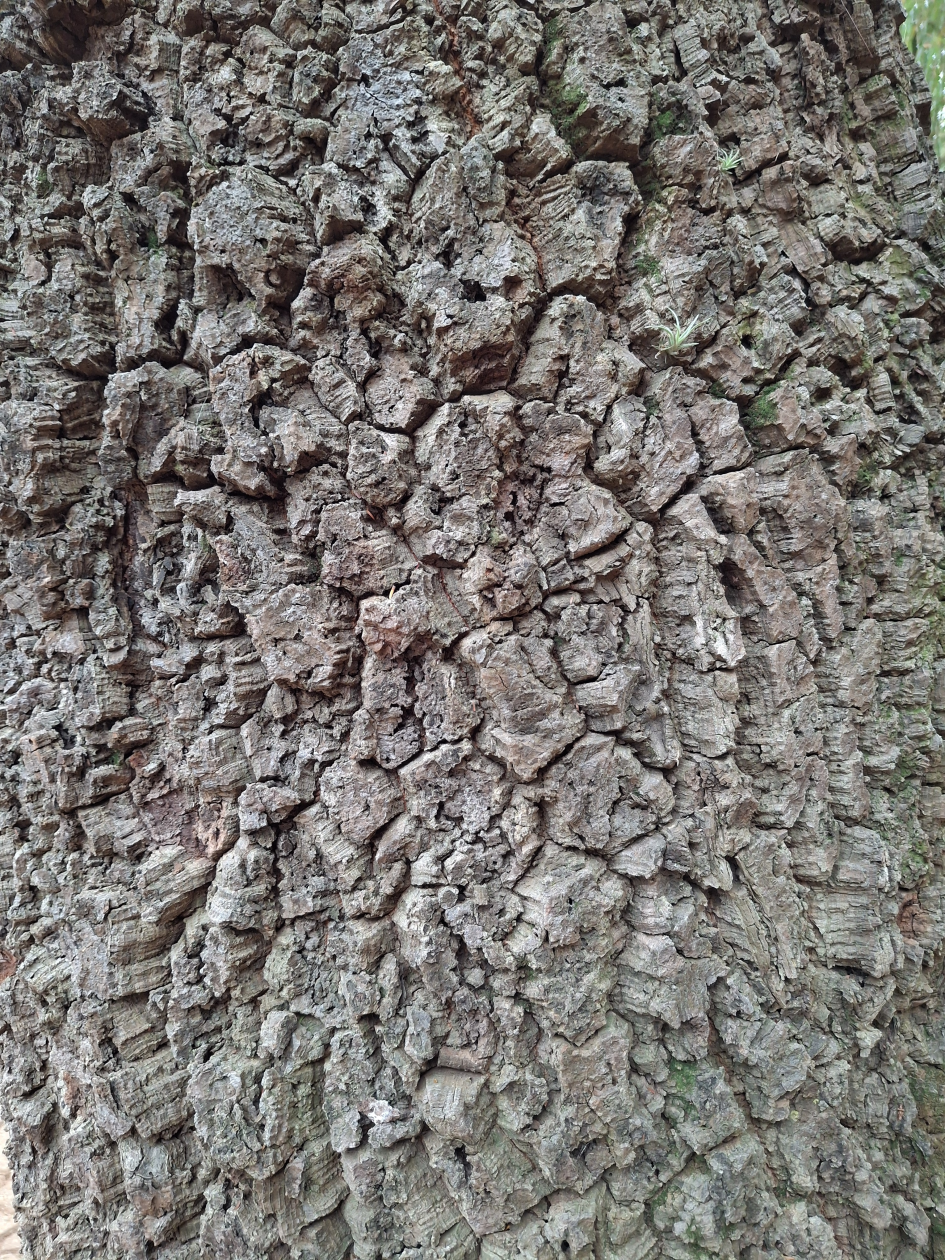
Anadenanthera peregrina var. falcata bark

== See also ==
- List of plants of Cerrado vegetation of Brazil
