= N-Methylserotonin =

Names
- Preferred IUPAC name 3-[2-(Methylamino)ethyl]-1H-indol-5-ol
- Other names Norbufotenin; Norbufotenine; N_{ω}-Methylserotonin; N-Methyl-5-hydroxytryptamine; 5-Hydroxy-N-methyltryptamine; 5-HO-NMT; 5-OH-NMT; N-Me-5-HT

Identifiers
CAS Number	1134-01-6
3D model (JSmol)	Interactive image
ChEBI	CHEBI:48294
ChemSpider	132989
PubChem CID	150885
UNII	MZ25L5SJ6Z
CompTox Dashboard (EPA)	DTXSID40150396
- InChI: InChI=1S/C11H14N2O/c1-12-5-4-8-7-13-11-3-2-9(14)6-10(8)11/h2-3,6-7,12-14H,4-5H2,1H3 Key: ASUSBMNYRHGZIG-UHFFFAOYSA-N; InChI=1/C11H14N2O/c1-12-5-4-8-7-13-11-3-2-9(14)6-10(8)11/h2-3,6-7,12-14H,4-5H2,1H3 Key: ASUSBMNYRHGZIG-UHFFFAOYAK
- SMILES: Oc1cc2c(cc1)[nH]cc2CCNC

Properties
Chemical formula	C_{11}H_{14}N_{2}O
Molar mass	190.246 g·mol^{−1}
- Except where otherwise noted, data are given for materials in their standard state (at 25 °C [77 °F], 100 kPa). Infobox references

N-Methylserotonin, also known as norbufotenin or as 5-hydroxy-N-methyltryptamine (5-HO-NMT), is a tryptamine alkaloid. Chemically, it is a derivative of serotonin in which a methyl group resides at its alkyl amine. It is also called N_{ω}-methylserotonin (N_{ω}-methyl-5-hydroxytryptamine) to distinguish it from tryptamine-derived compounds in which a methyl group is bonded to the nitrogen atom of the indole group.

N-Methylserotonin is found in plants, animals, and fungi. These include the plants, Actaea racemosa (black cohosh) and the Green and Golden Bell Frog, Litoria aurea, and Amanita mushrooms.

== Pharmacology ==
=== Pharmacodynamics ===
The compound binds to several serotonin receptors, including the 5-HT_{7} and 5-HT_{1A} receptors, with high affinity (IC_{50} ≤ 2 nM) and selectivity, and displays agonist activity. It also shows lower affinity for other serotonin receptors. It is a potent serotonin receptor agonist in the rat stomach strip. Besides its direct interaction with the serotonin receptors, N-methylserotonin acts as a serotonin reuptake inhibitor.

== Chemistry ==
=== Analogues ===
Analogues of NMS (5-HO-NMT) include serotonin (5-HT), bufotenin (5-HO-DMT; N,N-dimethylserotonin), dimethyltryptamine (DMT), 4-HO-NMT, and α-methylserotonin (AMS; 5-HO-AMT), among others.

== Society and culture ==
=== Legal status ===
==== United States ====
N-Methylserotonin is not scheduled at the federal level in the United States, but could be considered an analog (of bufotenin), in which case, sales or possession intended for human consumption could be prosecuted under the Federal Analog Act.

===== Florida =====
N-Methylserotonin is a Schedule I controlled substance in the state of Florida making it illegal to buy, sell, or possess in Florida.

== See also ==
- Substituted tryptamine
