= Brosimum acutifolium =

Conservation status
- Least Concern (IUCN 3.1)

Scientific classification
- Kingdom: Plantae
- Clade: Tracheophytes
- Clade: Angiosperms
- Clade: Eudicots
- Clade: Rosids
- Order: Rosales
- Family: Moraceae
- Genus: Brosimum
- Species: B. acutifolium

Binomial name
- Brosimum acutifolium Huber

Subspecies
- Brosimum acutifolium subsp. acutifolium; Brosimum acutifolium subsp. interjectum C.C.Berg; Brosimum acutifolium subsp. obovatum (Ducke) C.C.Berg

Synonyms
- Brosimopsis acutifolia (Huber) Ducke; Piratinera acutifolia (Huber) Pittier; synonyms of subsp. obovatum: Brosimum caniceps Standl.; Brosimopsis obovata Ducke

Species of tree

Brosimum acutifolium is a species of tree in the genus Brosimum that is native to tropical South America. It grows in lowland Amazon Rainforest. The latex of Brosimum acutifolium contains bufotenin and is used as an entheogen and hallucinogen under the name takini by certain peoples in South America.

Three subspecies are accepted:

- Brosimum acutifolium subsp. acutifolium – Northern Brazil, French Guiana, and Suriname
- Brosimum acutifolium subsp. interjectum C.C.Berg – northern Brazil (Brazil (Pará, eastern Amazonas, and Maranhão)
- Brosimum acutifolium subsp. obovatum (Ducke) C.C.Berg – Bolivia, northern and west-central Brazil, Colombia, Ecuador, French Guiana, Guyana, and Peru

== See also ==
- Hallucinogenic snuff
