= Snuff tray =

Hand-carved tablet/tray made for the purpose of inhaling a psychoactive drug

A snuff tray, also known as a snuff tablet, is a hand-carved tablet or tray traditionally used in the preparation and inhalation of sacred plants in powder form, typically administered through a snuff tube. These preparations are intended to induce visionary experiences and are part of ceremonial practices among various Indigenous cultures. Snuff trays are best known from the Tiwanaku and Wari civilizations of the Andes in South America. The most frequently used botanical source was Anadenanthera colubrina (known as willka or cebil), while in northern South America, the closely related Anadenanthera peregrina was used to prepare **yopo**, and in the Greater Antilles, it was known as **cohoba**. In addition to wooden and stone examples, archaeologists have also recovered golden snuff trays from the Muisca culture, now housed in the Museo del Oro in Bogotá, Colombia.

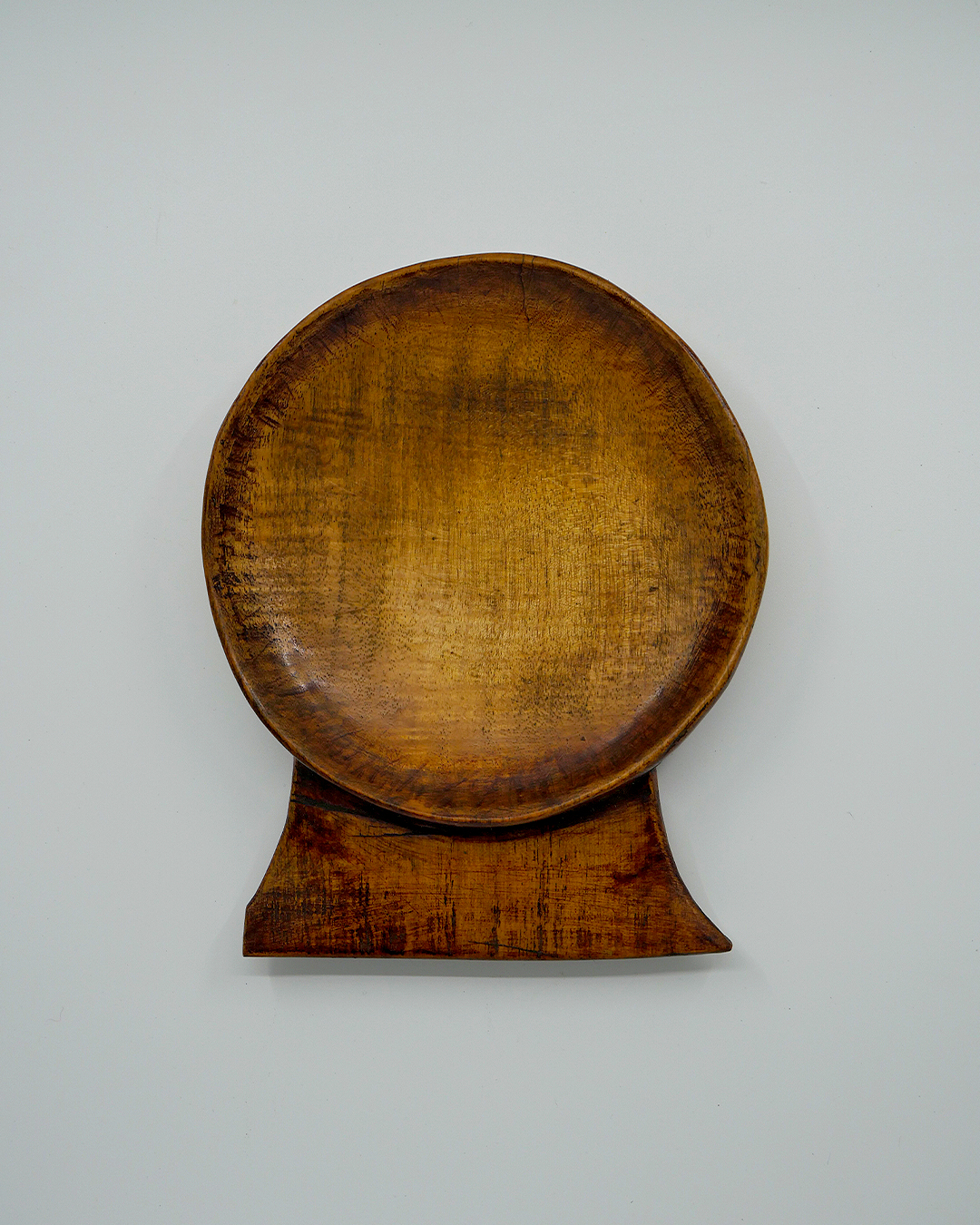
Yopo Plate (Piaroa)

Beyond their physical form, snuff trays fulfilled complex ceremonial functions in ancient South American societies. They were part of broader ritual kits that included inhaling tubes, spatulas, mortars, and other implements used in practices of healing, vision, and cosmological communication. Many trays feature carved designs interpreted as representations of mythological beings, celestial patterns, or ancestral spirits, particularly in the art of the Tiwanaku and Wari civilizations.

While most archaeological examples date to pre-Columbian contexts, related instruments remain in ceremonial use today. Among the Piaroa people of the Upper Orinoco, for instance, small undecorated wooden trays are used to serve the sacred preparation Ñuá. These objects are valued not for aesthetic detail but for their role in sustaining cosmological order and cultural continuity.

== Style ==
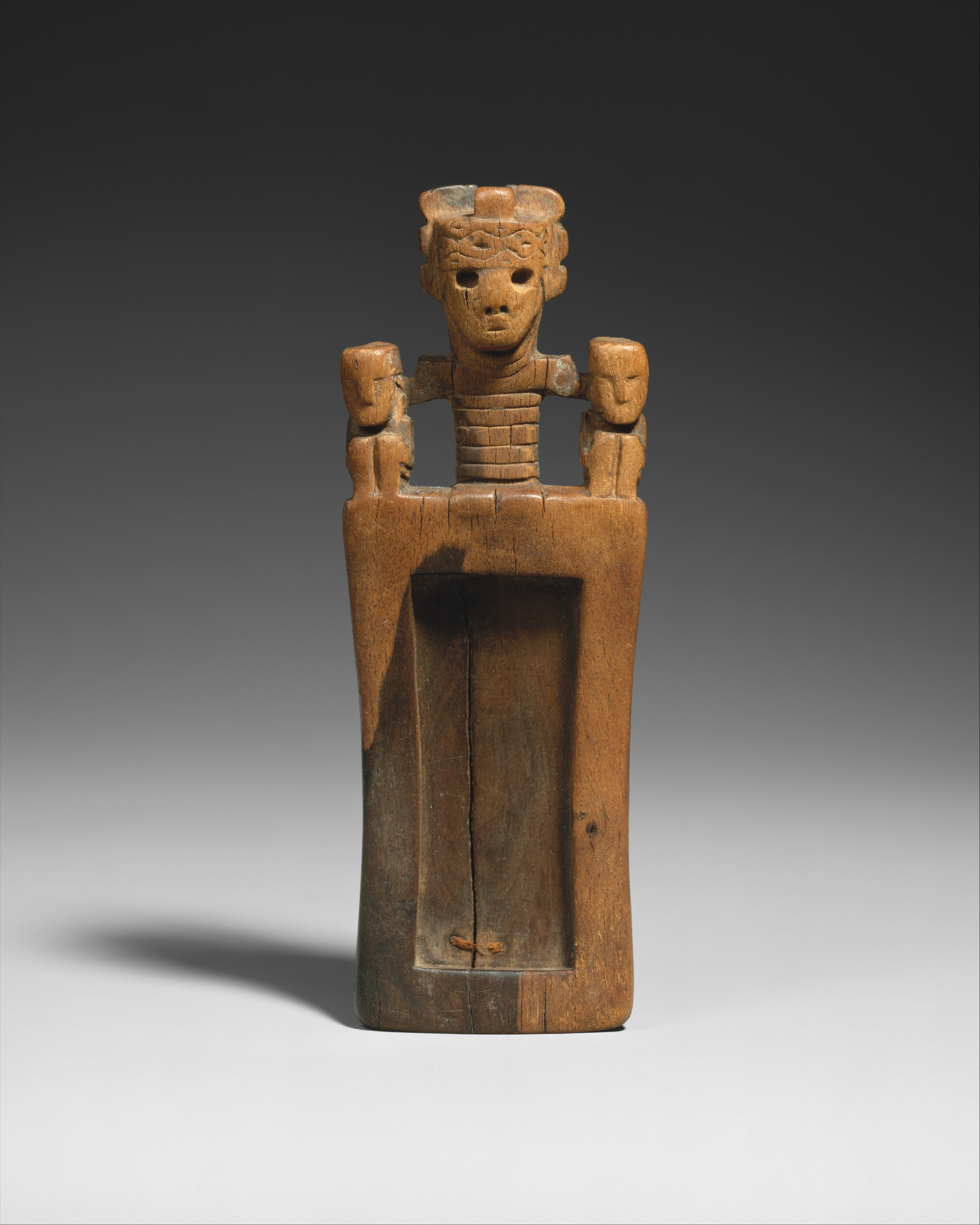
This is an example of a San Pedro de Atacama snuff tray that is identified as a San Pedro example of the two groups (Circumpueño and San Pedro). This is because of the anthropomorphic human figure on top of the tray. It can also be identified as a San Pedro tray because it does not have zoomorphic or animal within the carving.

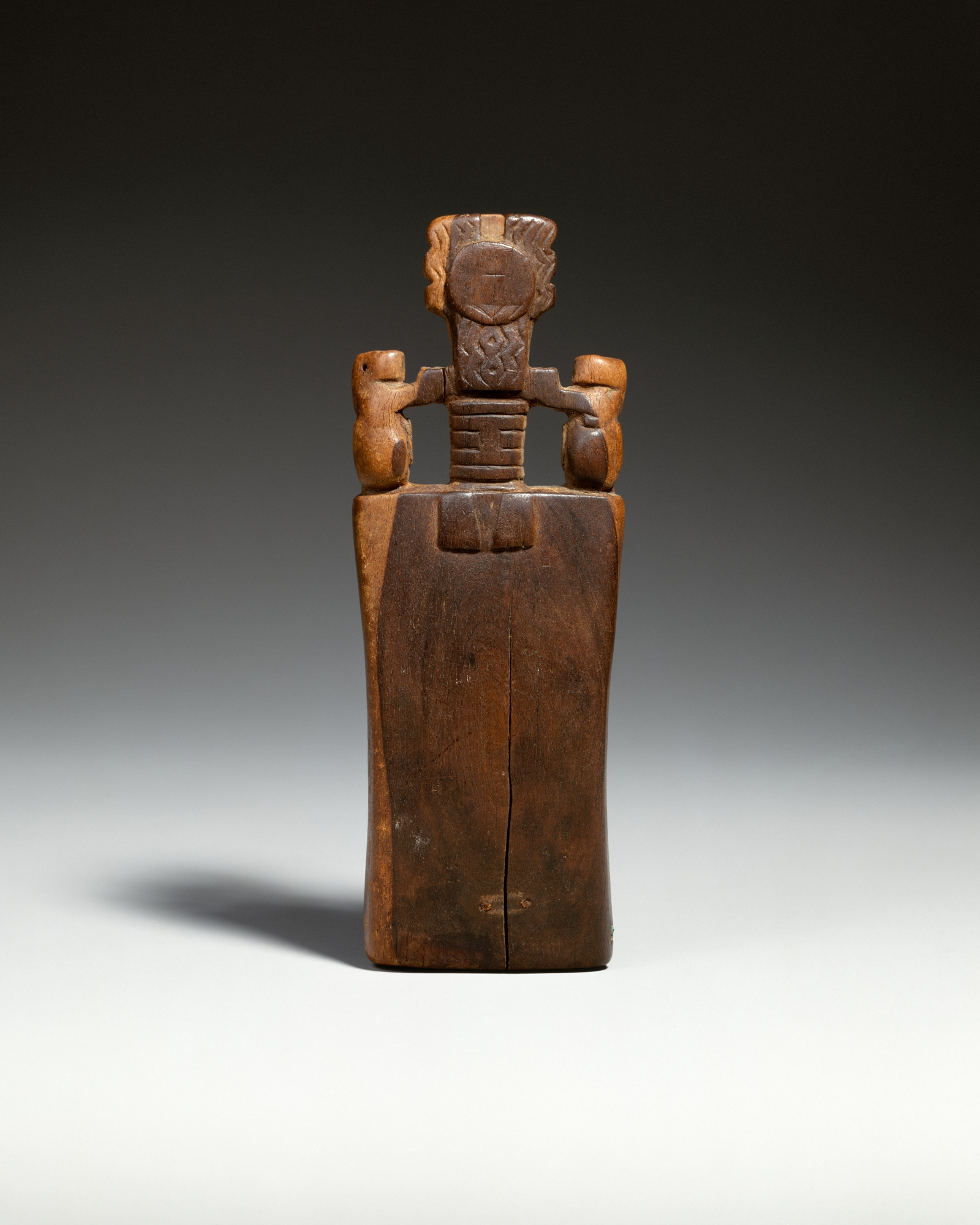
This is an example of a San Pedro de Atacama snuff tray that is identified as a Circumpueño style tray of the two groups (Circumpueño and San Pedro). This is because of the zoomorphic or animal figures flanking the top of the tray.

Scientists have tried to categorize these trays based on carvings, geographical significance, time periods and stylistic features. Yet, many trays do not fully represent one style or the other because they are "blank" or lacking significant stylistic features to differentiate them from one style or the other. Snuff trays lacking significant stylistic features make up about 90% of the snuff tray collection to date. Due to this there are mainly two styles of snuff trays. One being the Tiwanaku (Tiahuanaco) style which scientists refer to as the Southern Andean Iconographic style or SAIS. The Tiwanaku (SAIS) style is characterized by a trapezoidal shape, incurving sides and sharp top corners. There are very few snuff trays that represent the Tiwanaku (SAIS) style which makes up about 10% of the collection. While the other 90% are from the Wari (Huari) culture which scientists refer to as the San Pedro de Atacama style or SPA. Due to the abundance of non-Tiwanaku style snuff trays some scientists have tried to better categorize Wari (SPA) trays by creating sub-categories. They have separated the collection from the San Pedro de Atacama (SPA) region into two groups. The first group is referred to as the Circumpueño style. The Circumpueño style trays have been identified through anthropomorphic (human) and zoomorphic (animal) figures performing ceremonial acts or rituals. These trays have been dated back to the Late Intermediate period (100A.D.-1450). The second style of snuff tray is referred to by scientists as the San Pedro style. This style of tray is identified through carved human figures that are not decorated. Scientists have dated San Pedro style trays to the Late Formative period (3500-2000 B.C.) the Middle Horizon (A.D. 700-1000) and the Late Intermediate periods (A.D. 1000-1200). Though these categories have helped scientists condense the 90% of trays lacking significant stylistic features to 50%, scientists are still lacking distinctive evidence to categorize the remaining trays.

== Sites of discovery ==
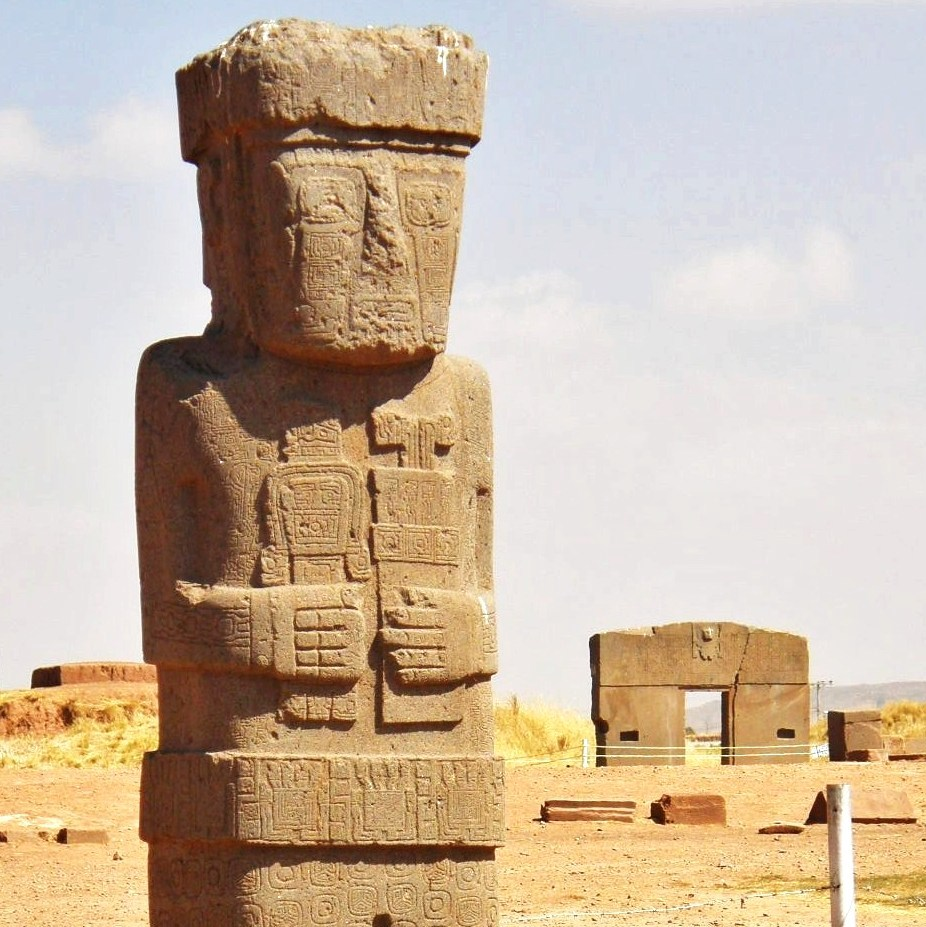
This is an example of a Tiwanaku monolith statue holding a snuff tray. The snuff tray is being held in the statue’s right hand.

Archaeologists encountered snuff trays while excavating underground tombs and sites in the San Pedro de Atacama region as well as the southern central Andes. Snuff trays were found buried with the elites of ancient societies in their tombs along with other valuable items that lower socioeconomic peoples would not have had access to. Along with snuff trays these mummies have been found with inhaling tubes, spatulas, mortars and pestles, and snuff powder containers. In addition, snuff trays have been found in statues or monolith depictions of mythical ancestral elites or ancestral rulers at Tiwanaku Only so-called presentation monoliths (statues holding a Qiru in the one hand and a snuff tray in the other hand) are holding a snuff tray in one of their hands. Those monoliths are found exclusively at Tiwanaku. This evidence points to snuff trays as having a huge significance in the society and culture of the Tiwanaku state because of their existence. Due to this evidence, scientists and archeologists have concluded that snuff trays were a very significant part of society, culture and the socioeconomic class structure of higher up elite individuals.

== Usage ==
Snuff trays were used to inhale hallucinogenic drugs, mainly willka and yopo.
