= Dimethyltryptamine-N-oxide =

Names
- Preferred IUPAC name 2-(1H-Indol-3-yl)-N,N-dimethylethan-1-amine oxide
- Other names N,N-Dimethyltryptamine N-oxide

Identifiers
CAS Number	948-19-6
3D model (JSmol)	Interactive image
ChEMBL	ChEMBL1779164
ChemSpider	4475872
PubChem CID	5316905
UNII	GMX9BNT3VX
CompTox Dashboard (EPA)	DTXSID001024770
- InChI: Key: FSRSWKRQDYWUFG-UHFFFAOYSA-N; InChI=1S/C12H16N2O/c1-14(2,15)8-7-10-9-13-12-6-4-3-5-11(10)12/h3-6,9,13H,7-8H2,1-2H3
- SMILES: C[N+](C)(CCC1=CNC2=CC=CC=C21)[O-]

Properties
Chemical formula	C_{12}H_{16}N_{2}O
Molar mass	204.273 g·mol^{−1}
- Except where otherwise noted, data are given for materials in their standard state (at 25 °C [77 °F], 100 kPa). Infobox references

Dimethyltryptamine-N-oxide (DMT-N-oxide) is a dimethyltryptamine metabolite.
