= Bufotenin =

Psychedelic drug found in toads, mushrooms and plants

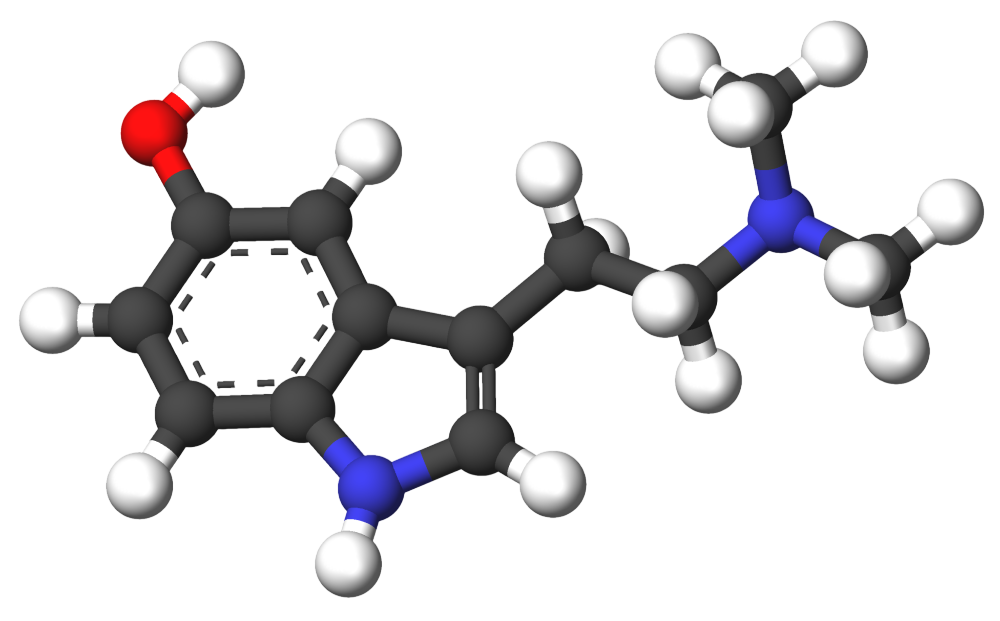

Clinical data
- Other names: Bufotenine; 5-Hydroxy-N,N-dimethyltryptamine; 5-HO-DMT; 5-OH-DMT; N,N-Dimethyl-5-hydroxytryptamine; N,N-Dimethylserotonin; Dimethylserotonin; Dimethyl-5-HT; Cebilcin; Mappine
- Routes of administration: Oral, intranasal/insufflation, inhalation, sublingual, rectal, intravenous
- Drug class: Serotonergic psychedelic; Hallucinogen; Serotonin receptor agonist; Serotonin 5-HT_{2A} receptor agonist
- ATC code: None

Legal status
- Legal status: AU: S9 (Prohibited substance); CA: Unscheduled; DE: NpSG (Industrial and scientific use only); UK: Class A; US: Schedule I; Illegal in Sweden

Pharmacokinetic data
- Bioavailability: Weakly active (with or without MAOI)
- Metabolism: Deamination via MAO-A and conjugation (glucuronidation, sulfation)
- Metabolites: • 5-HIAA • Glucuronide and sulfate conjugates
- Onset of action: PO: 20 min IN: 5–15 min SL: 5–15 min REC: ~15 min INH: ≤1–2 min IV: <1 min
- Duration of action: PO: ~2 hours IN: 30–90 min SL: 30–90 min REC: ~1 hour INH: 60–90 min IV: ~5–120 min

Identifiers
- IUPAC name: 3-[2-(Dimethylamino)ethyl]-1H-indol-5-ol
- CAS Number: 487-93-4
- PubChem CID: 10257
- IUPHAR/BPS: 144
- DrugBank: DB01445
- ChemSpider: 9839
- UNII: 0A31347TZK
- KEGG: C08299
- ChEBI: CHEBI:3210
- ChEMBL: ChEMBL416526
- CompTox Dashboard (EPA): DTXSID0048894
- ECHA InfoCard: 100.006.971

Chemical and physical data
- Formula: C_{12}H_{16}N_{2}O
- Molar mass: 204.273 g·mol^{−1}
- 3D model (JSmol): Interactive image
- Melting point: 146 to 147 °C (295 to 297 °F)
- Boiling point: 320 °C (608 °F)
- SMILES: CN(C)CCc1c[nH]c2ccc(O)cc12
- InChI: InChI=1S/C12H16N2O/c1-14(2)6-5-9-8-13-12-4-3-10(15)7-11(9)12/h3-4,7-8,13,15H,5-6H2,1-2H3; Key:VTTONGPRPXSUTJ-UHFFFAOYSA-N

Bufotenin, also known as dimethylserotonin or as 5-hydroxy-N,N-dimethyltryptamine (5-HO-DMT), is a serotonergic psychedelic of the tryptamine family. It is a derivative of the psychedelic dimethyltryptamine (DMT) and of the neurotransmitter serotonin (5-hydroxytryptamine; 5-HT). The compound is an alkaloid found in some species of mushrooms, plants, and toads. It is also found naturally in the human body in small amounts. Bufotenin, for instance derived from the trees Anadenanthera colubrina and Anadenanthera peregrina, has a long history of entheogenic use as a snuff in South America.

The name bufotenin originates from the toad genus Bufo, which includes several species of psychoactive toads, most notably Incilius alvarius (formerly Bufo alvarius), that secrete bufotoxins from their parotoid glands. However, Bufo and related species like Incilius alvarius contain only trace amounts of bufotenin, with their major active component instead being 5-MeO-DMT. In addition to DMT and serotonin, bufotenin is similar in chemical structure to other psychedelics such as 5-MeO-DMT and psilocin (4-HO-DMT). These compounds also occur in some of the same fungus, plant, and animal species as bufotenin.

Bufotenin acts as a potent and non-selective serotonin receptor agonist, including of the serotonin 5-HT_{1A}, 5-HT_{2A}, 5-HT_{2C}, and 5-HT_{3} receptors, among others. It also acts as a potent and specific serotonin releasing agent. The compound is more hydrophilic than other related tryptamines and consequently is more peripherally selective. In relation to this, bufotenin has been associated with prominent peripheral serotonergic side effects, such as cardiovascular changes. The cardiovascular effects of bufotenin can be powerful and potentially dangerous.

For many decades and even into the present, bufotenin has been considered by many experts, such as David E. Nichols, to be either inactive or only weakly active as a psychedelic in humans and to produce robust toxic effects. Alexander Shulgin was also uncertain whether bufotenin was an active psychedelic. However, Jonathan Ott found in 2001 via self-experimentation that bufotenin is in fact a potent psychedelic and does not necessarily produce serious adverse effects. Hamilton Morris has further supported these findings with his own self-experimentation, although bufotenin was reported to be strongly nauseating for himself and many others. According to Morris, the psychedelic effects of bufotenin are like a cross between those of DMT and 5-MeO-DMT. Morris has stated that bufotenin may in fact be the psychedelic with the longest history of human entheogenic use. Bufotenin has also been encountered as a recreational drug in forensic samples, for instance in New York City.

== Use and effects ==
=== Fabing & Hawkins (1955) ===
In 1955, Fabing and Hawkins administered bufotenin intravenously at doses of up to 16 mg to prison inmates at Ohio State Penitentiary. A toxic effect causing purpling of the face was seen in these tests.

A subject given 1 mg reported "a tight feeling in the chest" and prickling "as if he had been jabbed by needles." This was accompanied by a "fleeting sensation of pain in both thighs and a mild nausea."

Another subject given 2 mg reported "tightness in his throat." He had tightness in the stomach, tingling in pretibial areas, and developed a purplish hue in the face indicating blood circulation problems. He vomited after 3 minutes.

Another subject given 4 mg complained of "chest oppression" and that "a load is pressing down from above and my body feels heavy." The subject also reported "numbness of the entire body" and "a pleasant Martini feeling-my body is taking charge of my mind." The subject reported he saw red spots passing before his eyes and red-purple spots on the floor, and the floor seemed very close to his face. Within 2 minutes these visual effects were gone, and replaced by a yellow haze, as if he were looking through a lens filter.

Fabing and Hawkins commented that bufotenin's psychedelic effects were "reminiscent of [LSD] and mescaline but develop and disappear more quickly, indicating rapid central action and rapid degradation of the drug".

=== Isbell (1956) ===
In 1956, Harris Isbell at the Public Health Service Hospital in Lexington, Kentucky, experimented with bufotenin as a snuff made from Anadenanthera peregrina. He reported "no subjective or objective effects were observed after spraying with as much as 40 mg bufotenine"; however, subjects who received 10–12 mg by intramuscular injection reported "elements of visual hallucinations consisting of a play of colors, lights, and patterns."

=== Turner & Merlis (1959) ===
Turner and Merlis (1959) experimented with intravenous administration of bufotenin (as the water-soluble creatinine sulfate salt) to schizophrenics at a New York state hospital. They reported that when one subject received 10 mg during a 50-second interval, "the peripheral nervous system effects were extreme: at 17 seconds, flushing of the face, at 22 seconds, maximal inhalation, followed by maximal hyperventilation for about 2 minutes, during which the patient was unresponsive to stimuli; her face was plum-colored." Finally, Turner and Merlis reported:

on one occasion, which essentially terminated our study, a patient who received 40 mg intramuscularly, suddenly developed an extremely rapid heart rate; no pulse could be obtained; no blood pressure measured. There seemed to have been an onset of auricular fibrillation . . . extreme cyanosis developed. Massage over the heart was vigorously executed and the pulse returned to normal . . . shortly thereafter the patient, still cyanotic, sat up saying: "Take that away. I don't like them."

After pushing doses to the morally admissible limit without producing visuals, Turner and Merlis conservatively concluded: "We must reject bufotenine . . . as capable of producing the acute phase of Cohoba intoxication."

=== Hofmann (1963) ===
Albert Hofmann tried bufotenin orally at doses of up to 50 mg but experienced no psychoactive effects.

=== McLeod and Sitaram (1985) ===
A 1985 study by McLeod and Sitaram in humans reported that bufotenin administered intranasally at a dose of 1–16 mg had no effect, other than intense local irritation. When given intravenously at low doses (2–4 mg), bufotenin oxalate caused anxiety but no other effects; however, a dose of 8 mg resulted in profound emotional and perceptual changes, involving extreme anxiety, a sense of imminent death, and visual disturbance associated with color reversal and distortion, and intense flushing of the cheeks and forehead.

=== Shulgin (1997) ===
Alexander Shulgin reviewed the literature on bufotenin in his book TiHKAL. However, he and his collaborators did not appear to try it themselves.

=== Ott (2001) ===
In 2001, ethnobotanist Jonathan Ott published the results of a study in which he self-administered free base bufotenin via insufflation (5–100 mg), sublingually (50 mg), rectally (30 mg), orally (100 mg) and via vaporization (2–8 mg). Ott reported "visionary effects" of intranasal bufotenin and that the "visionary threshold dose" by this route was 40 mg, with smaller doses eliciting perceptibly psychoactive effects. He reported that "intranasal bufotenine is throughout quite physically relaxing; in no case was there facial rubescence, nor any discomfort nor disesteeming side effects".

At 100 mg, effects began within 5 minutes, peaked at 35 to 40 minutes, and lasted up to 90 minutes. Higher doses produced effects that were described as psychedelic, such as "swirling, colored patterns typical of tryptamines, tending toward the arabesque". Free base bufotenin taken sublingually was found to be identical to intranasal use. The potency, duration, and psychedelic action was the same. Ott found vaporized free base bufotenin active from 2 to 8 mg with 8 mg producing "ring-like, swirling, colored patterns with eyes closed". He noted that the visual effects of insufflated bufotenin were verified by one colleague, and those of vaporized bufotenin by several volunteers.

Ott concluded that free base bufotenin taken intranasally and sublingually produced effects similar to those of Yopo without the toxic peripheral symptoms, such as facial flushing, observed in other studies in which the drug was administered intravenously.

=== Morris (2020s) ===
Hamilton Morris has experimented with bufotenin and found that it is active and powerful as a psychedelic. He has claimed that its effects are like a cross between those of DMT and 5-MeO-DMT, being less visual than DMT but more visual than 5-MeO-DMT. Morris has also stated that bufotenin is very nauseating and this has made it unpleasant for himself and other people. By insufflation, he has said that its duration is about 1 hour and is longer than that of DMT or 5-MeO-DMT.

Morris and others have suggested use of the serotonin 5-HT_{3} receptor antagonist ondansetron (Zofran) to prevent nausea and vomiting with especially nauseating or serotonin 5-HT_{3} receptor agonistic serotonergic psychedelics like bufotenin.

== Side effects ==
Side effects of bufotenin include nausea and vomiting, among others. It can also produce powerful and potentially dangerous and frightening cardiovascular side effects at doses that allow for hallucinogenic effects.

== Overdose ==
The acute toxicity (LD_{50}) of bufotenin in rodents has been estimated at 200 to 300 mg/kg. Death occurs by respiratory arrest. In April 2017, a South Korean man died after consuming bufotenin-containing toads that had been mistaken for edible Asian bullfrogs, while in Dec. 2019, five Taiwanese men became ill and one man died after eating bufotenin-containing Central Formosa toads that they mistook for frogs.

== Pharmacology ==
=== Pharmacodynamics ===
Bufotenin activities
Target	Affinity (K_{i}, nM)
5-HT_{1A}	2.5–1,023 (K_{i}); 13–766 (EC_{50}); 93–121% (E_{max})
5-HT_{1B}	41–912 (K_{i}); 0.33–1.5 (EC_{50}); 102–124% (E_{max})
5-HT_{1D}	3.7–29 (K_{i}); 0.66–2.6 (EC_{50}); 86–102% (E_{max})
5-HT_{1E}	25 (K_{i}); 0.21–11 (EC_{50}); 95–121% (E_{max})
5-HT_{1F}	32 (K_{i}); 0.78–9.8 (EC_{50}); 96–109% (E_{max})
5-HT_{2A}	15–>10,000 (K_{i}); 3.5–232 (EC_{50}); 43–106% (E_{max})
5-HT_{2B}	6.2–630 (K_{i}); 1.9–3.2 (EC_{50}); 60–68% (E_{max})
5-HT_{2C}	16–209 (K_{i}); 2.3–182 (EC_{50}); 84–106% (E_{max})
5-HT_{3}	34–210 (K_{i}); ND (EC_{50}); ND (E_{max})
5-HT_{4}	ND (K_{i}); 191–1,590 (EC_{50}); 71% (E_{max})
5-HT_{5A}	302–2,900 (K_{i}); 1,000–2,750 (EC_{50}); 85–128% (E_{max})
5-HT_{5B}	1,585 (K_{i}); ND (EC_{50}); ND (E_{max})
5-HT_{6}	4.5–112 (K_{i}); 30 (EC_{50}); 111% (E_{max})
5-HT_{7}	7.9–95 (K_{i}); 21 (EC_{50}); 100% (E_{max})
α_{1A}–α_{1D}	>10,000
α_{2A}–α_{2C}	>10,000
β_{1}–β_{3}	>10,000
D_{1}, D_{2}	>10,000
D_{3}	692
D_{4}, D_{5}	>10,000
H_{1}–H_{4}	>10,000
M_{1}–M_{5}	>10,000
TAAR_{1}	ND
I_{1}	ND
σ_{1}, σ_{2}	>10,000
OR	>10,000
SERT	1,120 (K_{i}); 1,200 (IC_{50}); 30.5 (EC_{50})
NET	>10,000 (K_{i}); ND (IC_{50}) >10,000 (EC_{50})
DAT	>10,000 (K_{i}); ND (IC_{50}) >10,000 (EC_{50})
Notes: The smaller the value, the more avidly the drug binds to the site. Proteins are animal or human. Refs:

Bufotenin is an analogue of the monoamine neurotransmitter serotonin. Similarly to serotonin and related compounds like dimethyltryptamine (DMT), bufotenin is an agonist of the serotonin 5-HT_{1A}, 5-HT_{2A}, 5-HT_{2C}, 5-HT_{3}, and 5-HT_{4} receptors. It is also known to bind with high affinity to other serotonin receptors, including the serotonin 5-HT_{1B}, 5-HT_{1D}, 5-HT_{1F}, 5-HT_{6}, and 5-HT_{7} receptors. Bufotenin has about 5- to 10-fold higher affinity for the serotonin 5-HT_{2A} receptor than 5-MeO-DMT, about the same activational potency as 5-MeO-DMT at the receptor in vitro (EC_{50} = 3.49 nM and 3.87 nM, respectively), and about 3-fold higher in-vivo potency than 5-MeO-DMT when they are in the brain. In contrast to many other psychedelic tryptamines, bufotenin shows high affinity for the serotonin 5-HT_{3} receptors, similar to or higher than that of serotonin, and this receptor is strongly associated with production of nausea and vomiting. In addition to its serotonin receptor agonism, bufotenin is a potent serotonin releasing agent (SRA) with an EC_{50} value of 30.5 nM, whereas it is inactive as a releaser of dopamine or norepinephrine (EC_{50} > 10,000 nM).

A special property of 5-MeO-DMT is that it has much higher affinity for and activational potency at the serotonin 5-HT_{1A} receptor compared to other psychedelic tryptamines such as DMT and this is thought to confer it with unique and distinct hallucinogenic effects. Similarly, bufotenin has also shown greatly increased affinity for the serotonin 5-HT_{1A} receptor. Whereas the serotonin 5-HT_{1A} receptor affinities (K_{i} or IC_{50}) of tryptamine and DMT were 125 nM and 170 nM, respectively, the affinities of serotonin (5-HO-T), 5-methoxytryptamine (5-MeO-T), bufotenin (5-HO-DMT), and 5-MeO-DMT were 3 nM, 9 nM, 4.9 nM, and 6.5 nM, respectively. Comparing bufotenin to DMT, it had 35-fold higher affinity for the serotonin 5-HT_{1A} receptor in comparison. Findings were very similar in another study not only in terms of affinities but also activational potencies. Bufotenin had a similar EC_{50} at the serotonin 5-HT_{1A} receptor as serotonin, 5-MeO-T, and 5-MeO-DMT (13 nM, 3 nM, 14 nM, and 21 nM, respectively), and a far greater value than tryptamine or DMT (899 nM and 1,293 nM, respectively).

Bufotenin is thought to have reduced capacity to cross the blood–brain barrier due to its relatively high hydrophilicity and hence to show significant peripheral selectivity. As a result, bufotenin has a greater ratio of peripheral activity to central effect. Findings have been mixed on bufotenin and production of the head-twitch response, a behavioral proxy of psychedelic effects, in rodents, with some studies finding the response and others finding no effect. However, in a study that did report head-twitch induction, bufotenin required doses 5- to 14-fold higher than those of DMT, psilocybin, and psilocin to produce the effect. On the other hand, unlike other psychedelics, bufotenin fails to substitute for LSD, psilocybin, or 5-MeO-DMT in rodent drug discrimination tests. Relatedly, findings on the effects of bufotenin in animals have been described as "equivocal". Studies have been similarly mixed on the psychedelic effects of bufotenin in humans, with some finding a relative lack of psychedelic effects and pronounced toxic effects, while others have found psychedelic effects without major adverse effects. In any case, bufotenin has often been reported to produce pronounced peripheral serotonergic effects. These have included cardiovascular, gastrointestinal, and other effects, among them increased respiratory rate, chest heaviness, purpling of the head and neck skin (intense skin flushing), nausea, vomiting, and retching. It is possible that in addition to its limited central permeation, the peripheral effects of bufotenin have served to mask its central and hallucinogenic effects. The adverse effects of bufotenin may be more pronounced with intravenous injection compared to other routes such as insufflation.

In contrast to peripheral administration, intracerebroventricular injection of bufotenin in animals readily produces robust psychedelic-like behavioral effects similar to those of other serotonergic psychedelics like 5-MeO-DMT. In addition, 5-MeO-DMT, the O-methylated analogue of bufotenin, which has greater lipophilicity, is readily able to cross the blood–brain barrier and produce psychedelic effects. Bufotenin prodrug esters, with greater lipophilicity than bufotenin itself, like O-acetylbufotenin and O-pivalylbufotenin, have also shown robust psychedelic-like effects in animals.

=== Pharmacokinetics ===
Bufotenin has been reported to undergo a strong first-pass effect and to not be orally active. This is in contrast to its positional isomer psilocin, which is thought to form a pseudo-ring system that limits its susceptibility to metabolism by monoamine oxidase (MAO). However, bufotenin actually does show oral activity if sufficiently high doses are taken. About 10-fold higher doses of bufotenin seem to be required orally compared to parenterally for effects.

In rats, subcutaneously administered bufotenin (1–100 μg/kg) distributes mainly to the lungs, heart, and blood, and to a much lesser extent, the brain (hypothalamus, brain stem, striatum, and cerebral cortex), and liver. Only very small amounts of bufotenin reach the brain in rats following intravenous administration, which is attributed to its poor lipophilicity and consequent peripheral selectivity. The brain-to-blood ratio of 5-MeO-DMT (O-methylbufotenin) was 15 times higher than that of bufotenin in the study. Bufotenin reaches peak circulating concentrations at one hour and is nearly eliminated within 8 hours. In humans, intravenous administration of bufotenin results in excretion of (70%) of injected drug in the form of 5-HIAA, an endogenous metabolite of serotonin, while roughly 4% is eliminated unmetabolized in the urine. Orally administered bufotenin undergoes extensive first-pass metabolism by the enzyme monoamine oxidase.

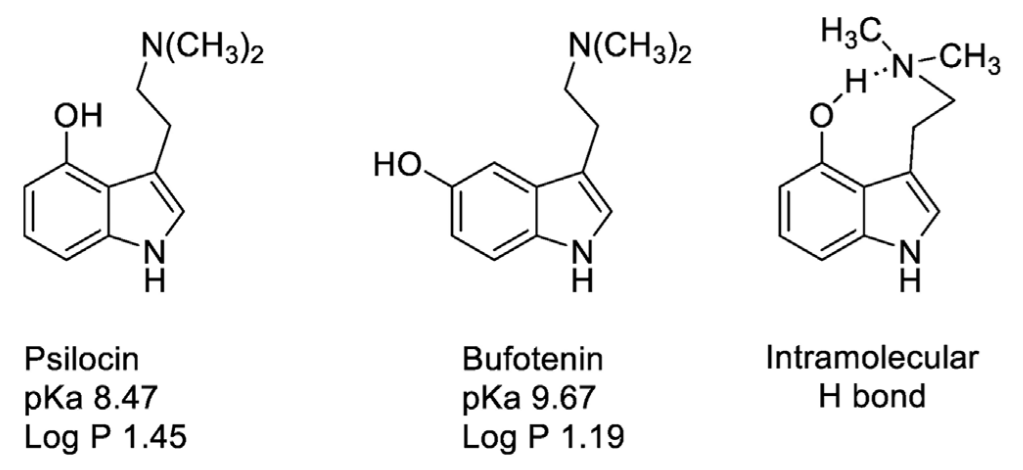
Theoretical intramolecular hydrogen bond and pseudo-ring system occurring with psilocin (4-HO-DMT) but not with bufotenin (5-HO-DMT).

Psilocin (4-HO-DMT) is a positional isomer of bufotenin and might be expected to have similarly limited lipophilicity and blood–brain permeability. However, psilocin appears to form a tricyclic pseudo-ring system wherein its hydroxyl group and amine interact through hydrogen bonding. This in turn results in psilocin being much less polar, more lipophilic, and more able to cross the blood–brain barrier and exert central actions than it would be otherwise. In contrast, bufotenin is not able to achieve this pseudo-ring system. Accordingly, bufotenin is less lipophilic than psilocin in terms of partition coefficient. In any case, bufotenin does still appear to show significant central permeability and, like psilocybin, can produce robust hallucinogenic effects in humans.

== Chemistry ==
Bufotenin, also known as 5-hydroxy-N,N-dimethyltryptamine (5-HO-DMT), is a substituted tryptamine and a derivative of dimethyltryptamine (DMT; N,N-dimethyltryptamine) and serotonin (5-hydroxytryptamine; 5-HT). It is also closely related to psilocin (4-HO-DMT) and 5-MeO-DMT.

=== Properties ===
The predicted log P of bufotenin ranges from 0.89 to 2.04. For comparison, the predicted log P of DMT is 2.06 to 2.5, of serotonin is 0.2 to 0.56, of 5-MeO-DMT is 1.5 to 2.38. and of psilocin is -0.14 to 2.1.

=== Synthesis ===
The chemical synthesis of bufotenin has been described.

=== Analogues and derivatives ===
Some analogues and derivatives of bufotenin (5-HO-DMT), aside from serotonin and DMT, include psilocin (4-HO-DMT) (a positional isomer), 6-HO-DMT (another positional isomer), 7-HO-DMT (another positional isomer), 5-MeO-DMT (O-methylbufotenin), O-acetylbufotenine (5-AcO-DMT), O-pivalylbufotenine (5-t-BuCO-DMT), bufotenidine (N-methylbufotenin), bufoviridine (bufotenin O-sulfate), 5-HO-MET, 5-HO-DET, 5-HO-DPT, 5-HO-DiPT, and α-methylserotonin (AMS; 5-HO-AMT), among others.

== Natural occurrence ==
=== Toads ===
Bufotenin is found in the skin and eggs of several species of toads belonging to the genus Bufo, but is most concentrated in the Colorado River toad (formerly Bufo alvarius, now Incilius alvarius), the only toad species with enough bufotenin for a psychoactive effect. Extracts of toad toxin, containing bufotenin and other bioactive compounds, have been used in some traditional medicines such as ch'an su (probably derived from Bufo gargarizans), which has been used medicinally for centuries in China. It is also found in the cane toad (Rhinella marina).

The toad was "recurrently depicted in Mesoamerican art", which some authors have interpreted as indicating that the effects of ingesting Bufo secretions have been known in Mesoamerica for many years; however, others doubt that this art provides sufficient "ethnohistorical evidence" to support the claim.

In addition to bufotenin, Bufo secretions also contain digoxin-like cardiac glycosides, and ingestion of these toxins can be fatal. Ingestion of Bufo toad poison and eggs by humans has resulted in several reported cases of poisoning, some of which resulted in death. A court case in Spain, involving a physician who dosed people with smoked Mexican Toad poison, one of his customers died after inhaling three doses, instead of the usual of only one, had images of intoxicated with this smoke suffering obvious hypocalcemic hand muscular spasms.

Reports in the mid-1990s indicated that bufotenin-containing toad secretions had appeared as a street drug, supposedly but in fact not an aphrodisiac, ingested orally in the form of ch'an su, or as a psychedelic, by smoking or orally ingesting Bufo toad secretions or dried Bufo skins. The use of chan'su and love stone (a related toad skin preparation used as an aphrodisiac in the West Indies) has resulted in several cases of poisoning and at least one death. The practice of orally ingesting toad poison has been referred to in popular culture and in the scientific literature as toad licking and has drawn media attention. Albert Most, founder of the defunct Church of the Toad of Light and a proponent of spiritual use of Bufo alvarius toxin, published a booklet in 1984 titled Bufo Alvarius: The Psychedelic Toad of the Sonoran Desert which explained how to extract and smoke the secretions.

Bufotenin is also present in the skin secretion of three arboreal hylid frogs of the genus Osteocephalus (Osteocephalus taurinus, Osteocephalus oophagus, and Osteocephalus langsdorfii) from the Amazon and Atlantic rain forests.

=== Anadenanthera seeds ===
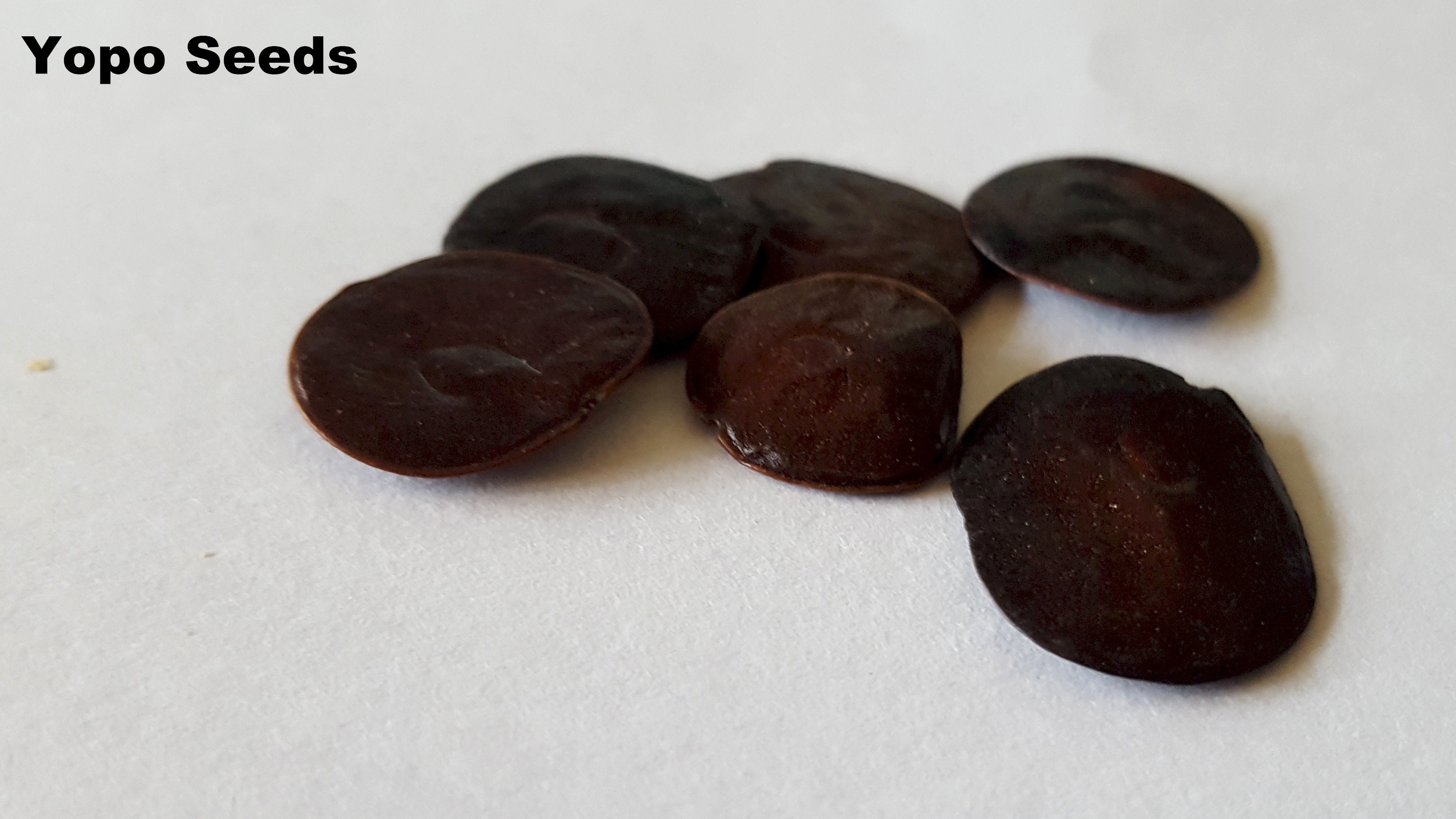
Yopo seeds from the perennial Anadenanthera peregrina tree have a long history of entheogenic use and induce a short but distinct psychedelic experience.

Bufotenin is a constituent of the seeds of Anadenanthera colubrina and Anadenanthera peregrina trees. Anadenanthera seeds have been used as an ingredient in psychedelic snuff preparations by indigenous cultures of the Caribbean, Central and South America since pre-Columbian times. The oldest archaeological evidence of use of Anadenanthera beans is over 4,000 years old.

=== Other sources ===
Bufotenin has been identified as a component in the latex of the takini (Brosimum acutifolium) tree, which is used as a psychedelic by South American shamans, and in the seeds of Mucuna pruriens. Bufotenin has also been identified in Amanita muscaria, Amanita citrina, A. porphyria, and A. tomentella.

=== Occurrence in humans ===
Bufotenin occurs in trace amounts in the human body. It can be biosynthesized from serotonin by indolethylamine N-methyltransferase (INMT) enzymes.

==== Association with psychiatric conditions ====
A study conducted in the late 1960s reported the detection of bufotenin in the urine of schizophrenic subjects; however, subsequent research failed to confirm these findings until 2010.

Studies have detected endogenous bufotenin in urine specimens from individuals with other psychiatric disorders, such as infant autistic patients. Another study indicated that paranoid violent offenders or those who committed violent behaviour towards family members have higher bufotenin levels in their urine than other violent offenders.

A 2010 study utilized a mass spectrometry approach to detect levels of bufotenin in the urine of individuals with severe autism spectrum disorder (ASD), schizophrenia, and asymptomatic subjects. Their results indicate significantly higher levels of bufotenin in the urine of the ASD and schizophrenic groups when compared to asymptomatic individuals.

A 2025 systematic review of eight studies found that urinary bufotenine was detected more often and at higher concentrations in many patients with psychiatric diagnoses than in controls, but significant methodological heterogeneity and overlap between groups mean the evidence is currently insufficient to support bufotenine as a reliable biomarker for mental illness

== History ==
Bufotenine was first isolated from secretions of the toad Bufo vulgaris by French scientists Césaire Phisalix and Gabriel Bertrand in 1893. It was also subsequently isolated from many other natural sources, including plants, fungi, and other toads over time. The compound was first isolated to purity by Austrian chemist Hans Handovsky in 1920. The chemical structure of bufotenine was confirmed by German chemist Heinrich Wieland and colleagues in 1934. The first reported synthesis of bufotenine was by Japanese researchers Toshio Hoshino and Kenya Shimodaira in 1935.

Bufotenin was established as a major component of hallucinogenic snuffs made from Anadenanthera peregrina such as cohoba and yopo in 1954. It was also isolated from Anadenanthera colubrina in 1955. Clinical studies assessed the effects of bufotenin and were published starting in 1956. However, the findings of these studies were conflicting, and bufotenin developed a long-standing reputation of being non-hallucinogenic as well as toxic. In any case, bufotenin nonetheless became a Schedule I controlled substance in the United States in 1967.

American ethnobotanist Jonathan Ott and colleagues subsequently showed in 2001 that bufotenin is in fact a psychedelic and does not necessarily produce major adverse effects, although marked nausea and vomiting are prominent. Bufotenin was first encountered as a novel recreational drug in 1992. Journalist Hamilton Morris corroborated Ott and colleagues' findings on the hallucinogenicity of bufotenin in the early 2020s.

== Society and culture ==
=== Names ===
Bufotenin, or bufotenine, is also known by the names 5-hydroxy-N,N-dimethyltryptamine (5-HO-DMT), N,N-dimethyl-5-hydroxytryptamine, dimethylserotonin, and mappine, among others.

=== Recreational use ===
Bufotenin has been encountered as a recreational drug in forensic samples, for instance in New York City.

=== Legal status ===
==== Australia ====
Bufotenin is classified as a Schedule I controlled substance according to the Criminal Code Regulations of the Government of the Commonwealth of Australia. It is also listed as a Schedule 9 substance under the Poisons Standard (October 2015). A schedule 9 drug is outlined in the Poisons Act 1964 as "Substances which may be abused or misused, the manufacture, possession, sale or use of which should be prohibited by law except when required for medical or scientific research, or for analytical, teaching or training purposes with approval of the CEO."

Under the Misuse of Drugs Act 1981 6.0 grams (0.21 oz) is determined to be enough for court of trial and 2.0 grams (0.071 oz) is considered intent to sell and supply.

==== Canada ====
Bufotenin is not an explicitly nor implicitly controlled substance in Canada as of 2025.

Germany

Bufotenin is controlled under the German NpSG (New Psychoactive Substances Act), whereby production and import with the aim of trading or administration to another person are punishable. However, although the possession of the substance is illegal, it is not punishable.

==== Sweden ====
Sweden's public health agency suggested classifying bufotenin as a hazardous substance, on May 15, 2019.

Switzerland

Under Buchstabe A, B, C and D bufotenin is not a controlled substance. However, it could be considered illegal.

==== United Kingdom ====
In the United Kingdom, bufotenin is a Class A drug under the 1971 Misuse of Drugs Act.

==== United States ====
Bufotenin (DEA Drug Code 7403) is regulated as a Schedule I drug by the Drug Enforcement Administration at the federal level in the United States and is therefore illegal to buy, possess, and sell.

== Research ==
Bufotenin is being investigated as a potential pharmaceutical drug by the Usona Institute. As of May 2025, it is in the discovery or preclinical research stage of development.

Bufotenin has shown antiviral activity against the rabies virus and has been found to increase survival rates against rabies in rodents.

== See also ==
- Substituted tryptamine
- List of entheogens
- List of investigational hallucinogens and entactogens
