= List of psychoactive plants =

List of plant species with reported psychoactive properties

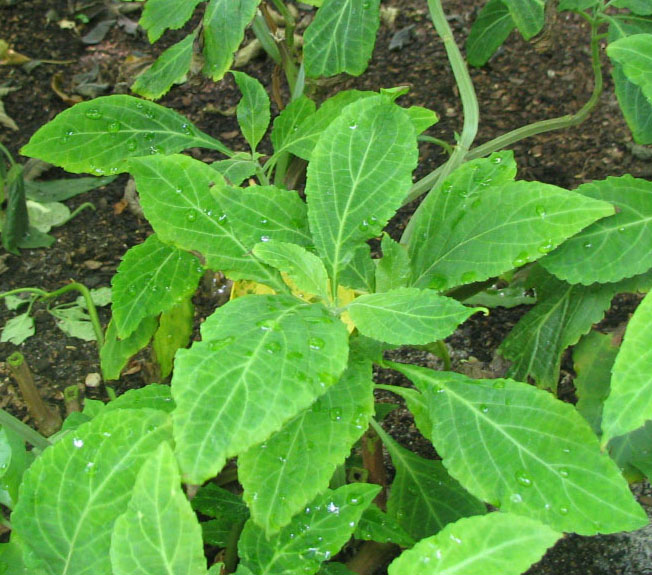
Salvia divinorum, a dissociative hallucinogenic sage

Psychoactive plants are plant species that, when consumed by humans, are known or suspected to produce changes in nervous system function that alter perception, mood, consciousness, cognition or behavior. Many of these plants are used intentionally as psychoactive drugs, for medicinal, religious, and/or recreational purposes. Some have been used ritually as entheogens for millennia.

These plants are listed according to the specific psychoactive chemical substances they contain; many contain multiple known psychoactive compounds.

== Cannabinoids ==
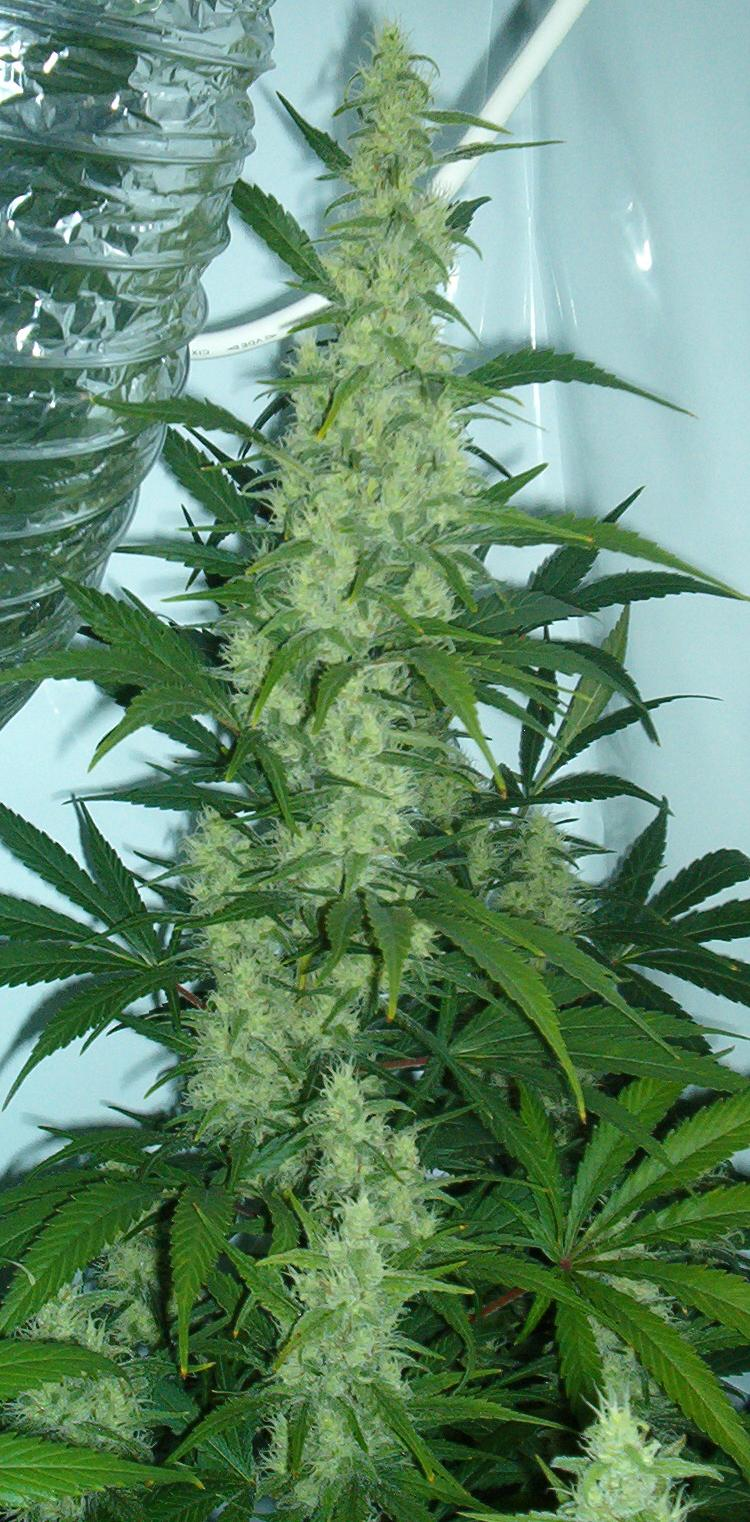
Cannabis plant

Species of the genus Cannabis, known colloquially as marijuana, (including Cannabis sativa and Cannabis indica) are psychoactive plants that are often used both medically and recreationally. The principal psychoactive substance in Cannabis is tetrahydrocannabinol (THC). THC contains no nitrogen, unlike many other psychoactive substances (Note: Other psychoactive compounds without nitrogen atoms include kavalactones and salvinorins, known from kava and Salvia divinorum, respectively.) and is not an indole, tryptamine or phenethylamine. THC is one of more than 100 identified cannabinoid compounds in Cannabis, which also include cannabinol (CBN) and cannabidiol (CBD).

Cannabis strains vary widely, with some producing dynamic balances of cannabinoids (THC, CBD, etc.) and yielding markedly different effects. Popular strains are often hybrids of C. sativa and C. indica.

The medicinal effects of cannabis are widely studied and are active topics of research both at universities and private research firms. Many jurisdictions have laws regulating or prohibiting the cultivation, sale and/or use of medical and recreational cannabis.

== Tryptamines ==
DMT molecule

5-MeO-DMT molecule

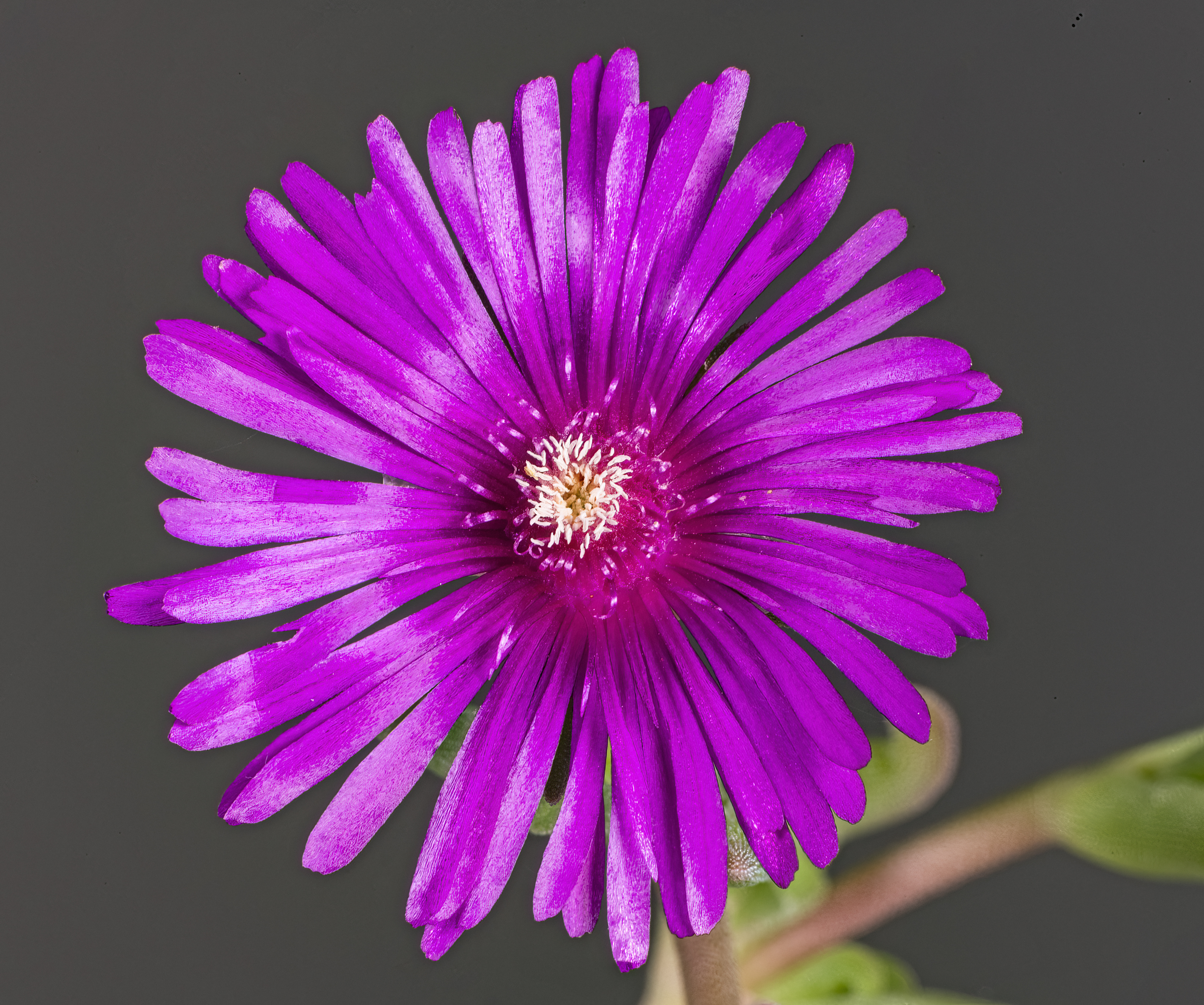
Delosperma cooperi flower

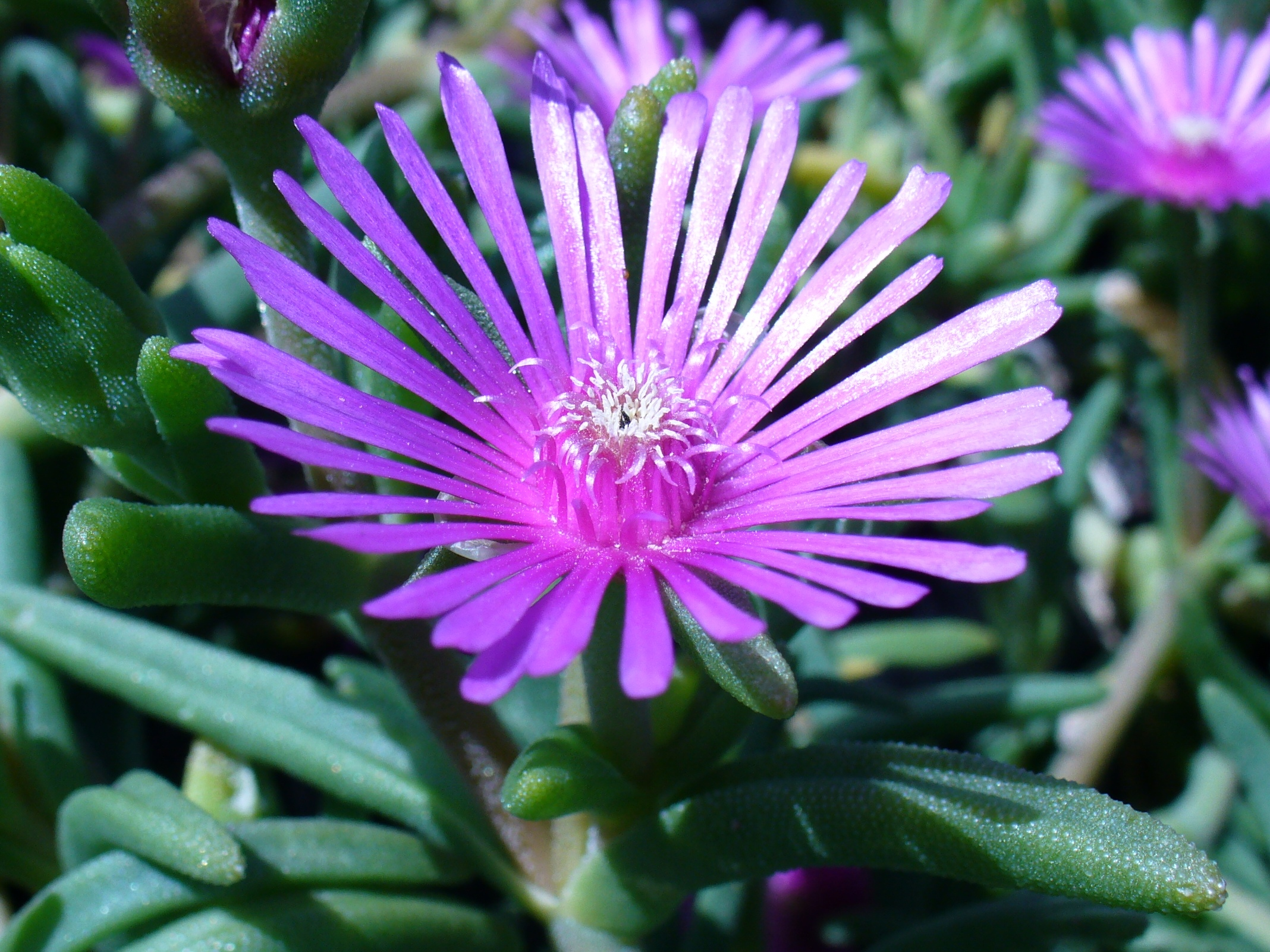
Delosperma lydenbergense flower

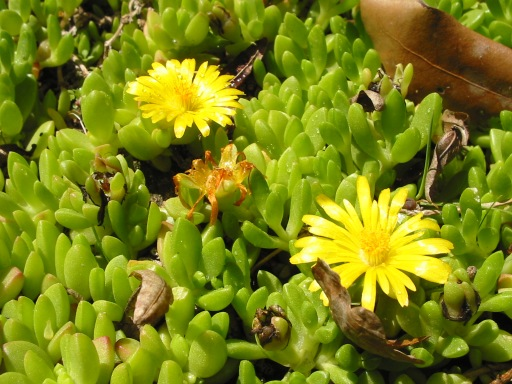
Delosperma nubigenum

Many psychedelic plants contain dimethyltryptamine (DMT) or other tryptamines. Tryptamines are snorted (Virola, Yopo snuffs), vaporized, or drunk with MAOIs (Ayahuasca). They cannot simply be eaten as they are not orally active without an MAOI. Also, they must be extremely concentrated to be vaporized.

=== Aceraceae ===
- Acer saccharinum (silver maple) was found to contain the indole alkaloid gramine (not active and extremely toxic) at a concentration of 0.05% in the leaves, so it is possible that other members of this plant family contain active compounds.

=== Aizoaceae ===
- Delosperma cooperi: DMT, 5-MeO-DMT.
- Delosperma ecklonis: DMT.
- Delosperma esterhuyseniae: DMT.
- Delosperma hallii: 5-MeO-DMT.
- Delosperma harazianum: DMT, 5-MeO-DMT.
  Delosperma harazianum
  Shibam: DMT.
- Delosperma hirtum: DMT.
  Delosperma hallii
  aff. litorale
- Delosperma lydenbergense: DMT, 5-MeO-DMT.
- Delosperma nubigenum, 5-MeO-DMT.
- Delosperma pageanum, DMT, 5-MeO-DMT.
- Delosperma pergamentaceum: traces of DMT.
- Delosperma tradescantioides: DMT.

=== Apocynaceae ===
- Prestonia amazonica: DMT.
- Voacanga africana: up to 10% Iboga alkaloids.

=== Erythroxylaceae ===
- Erythroxylum pungens: DMT.

=== Fabaceae (Leguminosae) ===
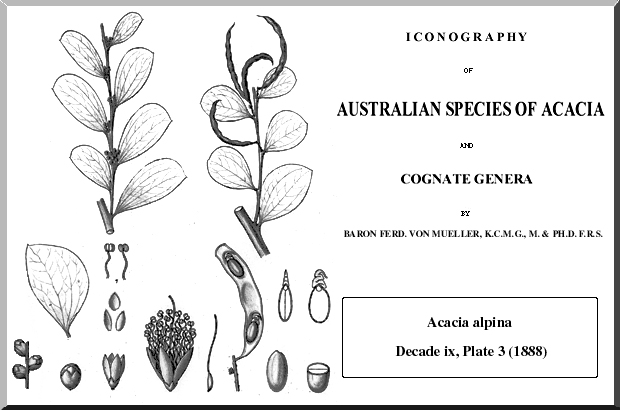
Alpina mueller

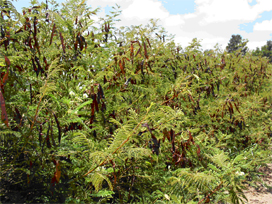
Acacia angustissima

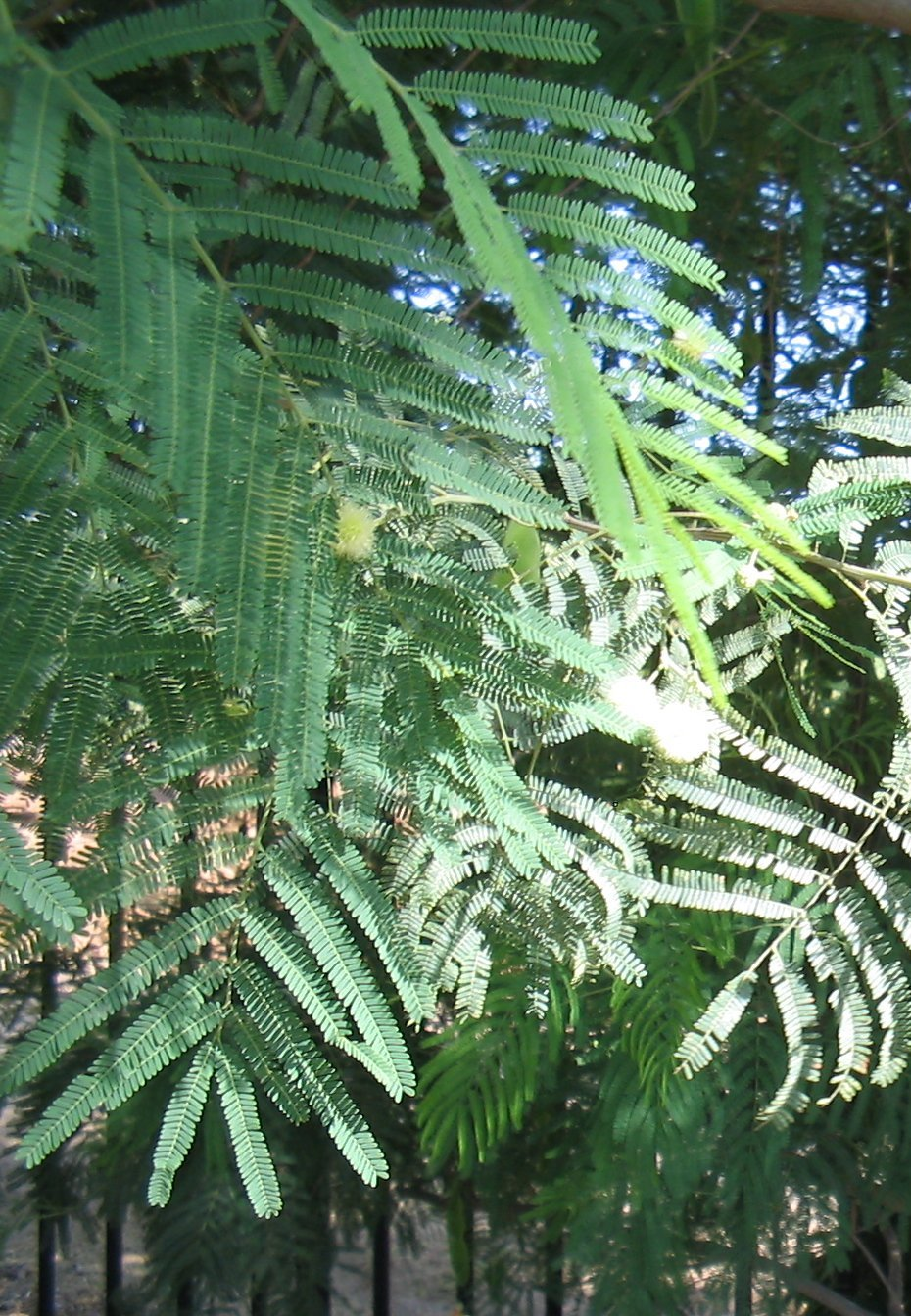
Acacia-berlandieri flower

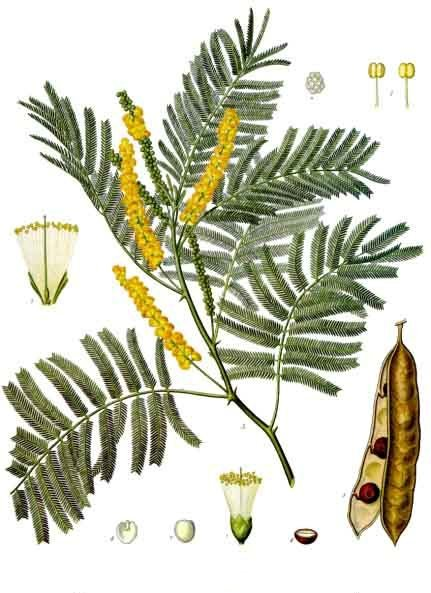
Acacia catechu

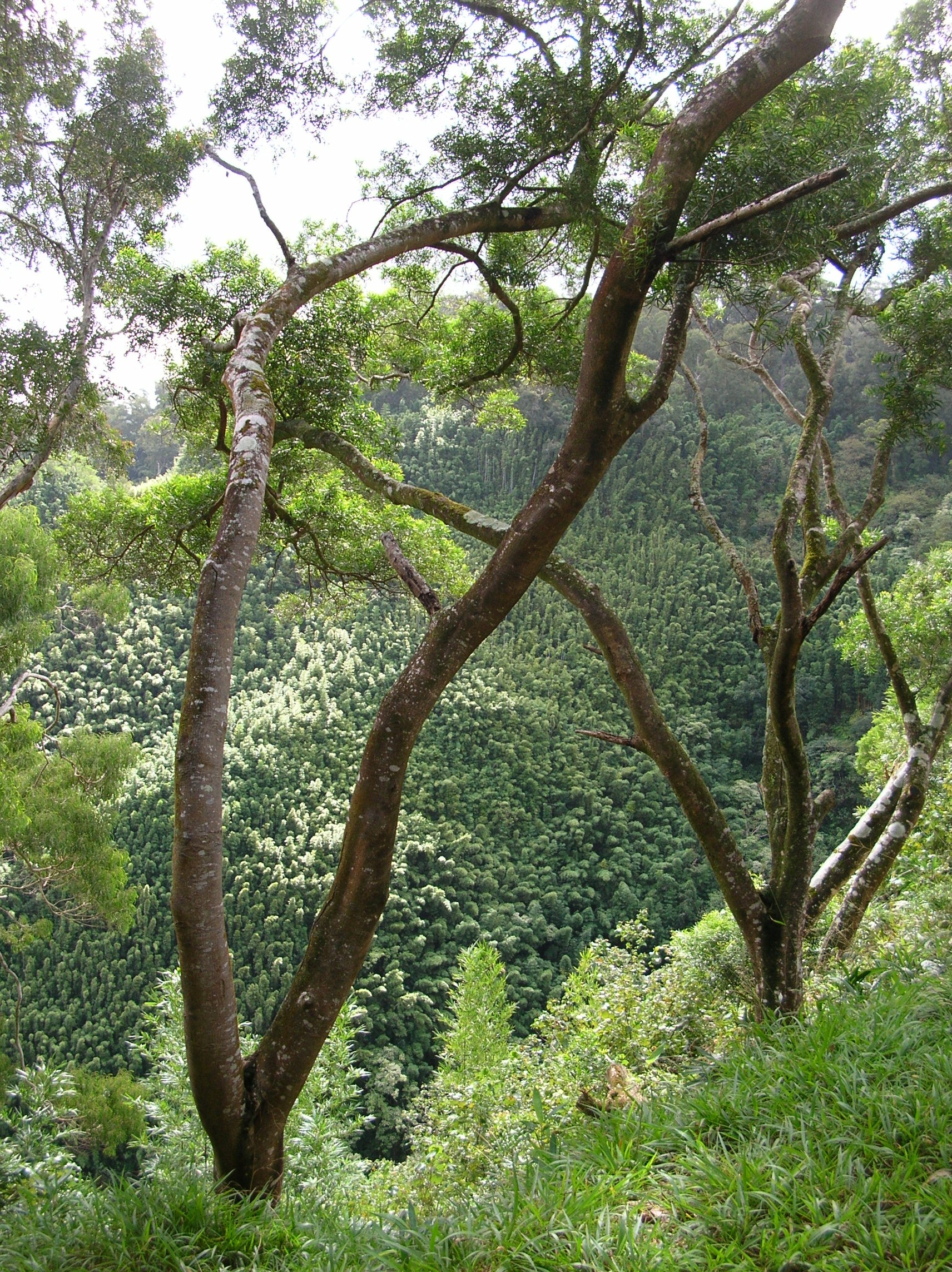
Acacia confusa

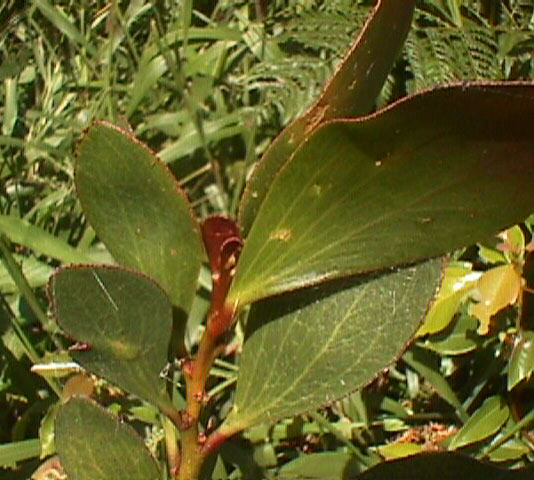
Acacia phlebophylla

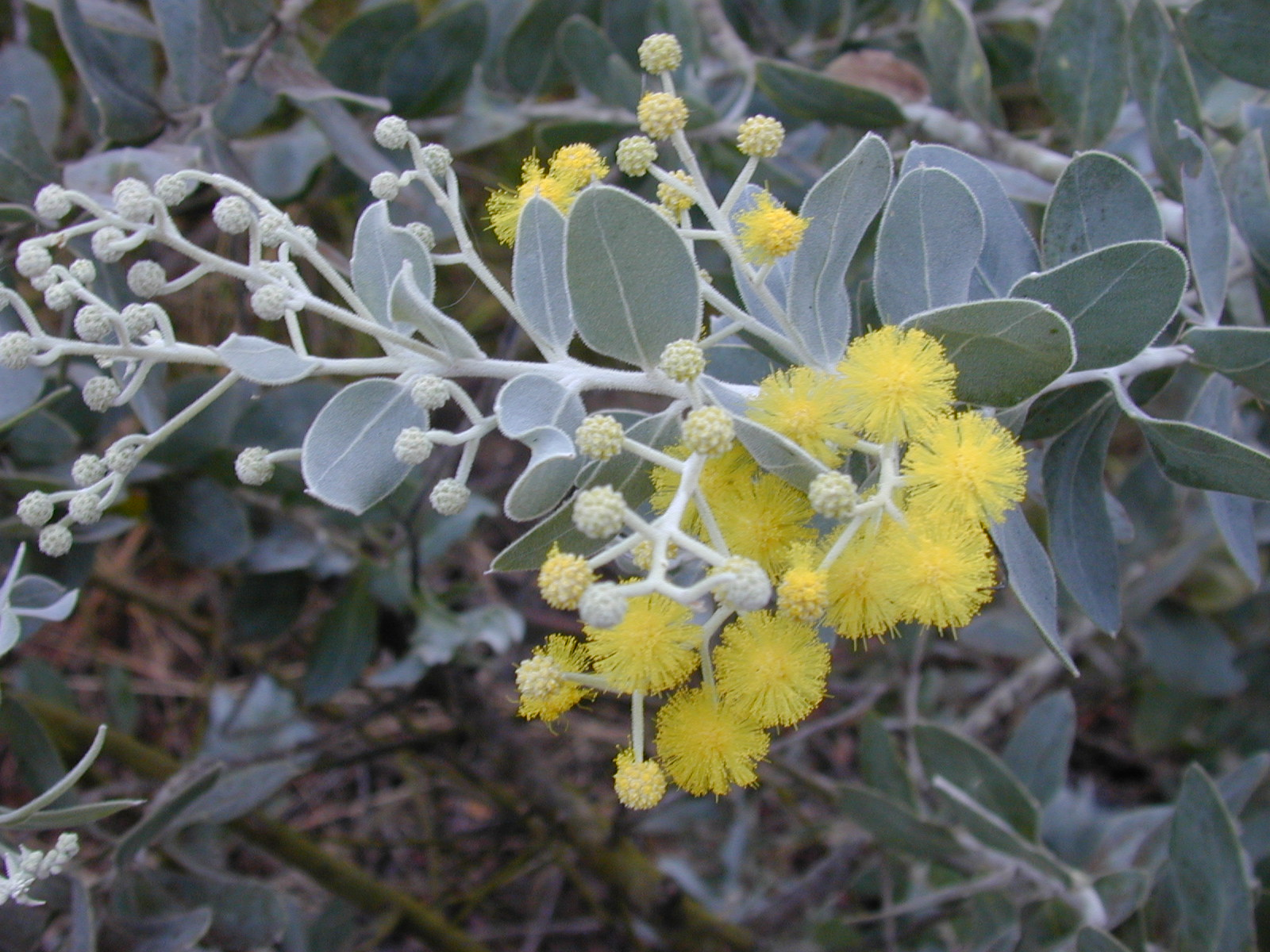

Bufotenin molecule

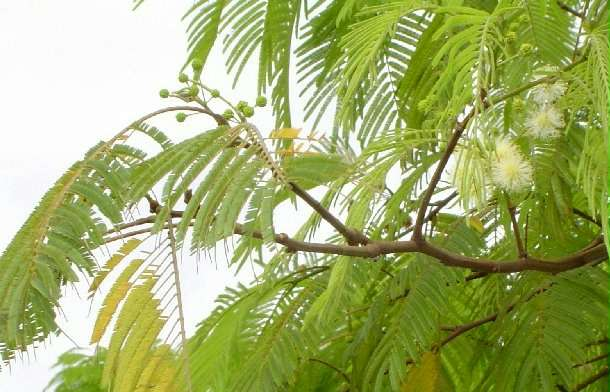
Anadenanthera colubrina

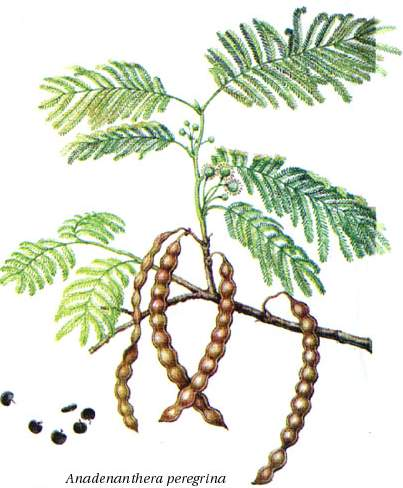
Anadenanthera peregrina

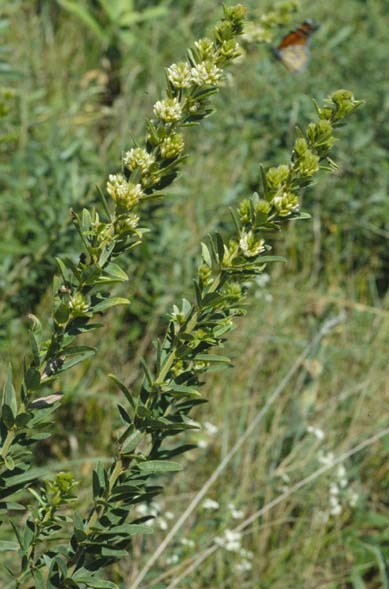
Lespedeza capitata

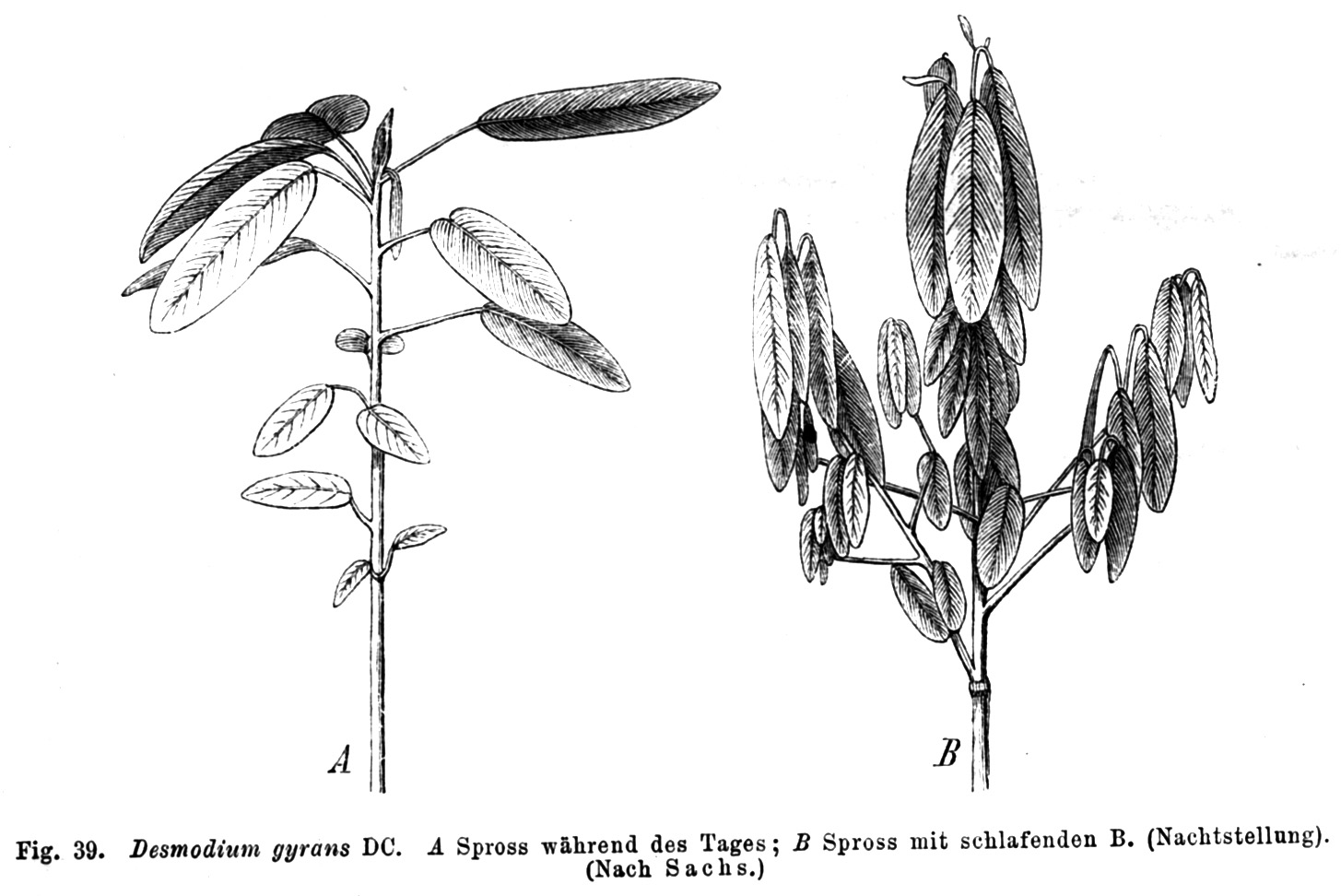
Codariocalyx motorius

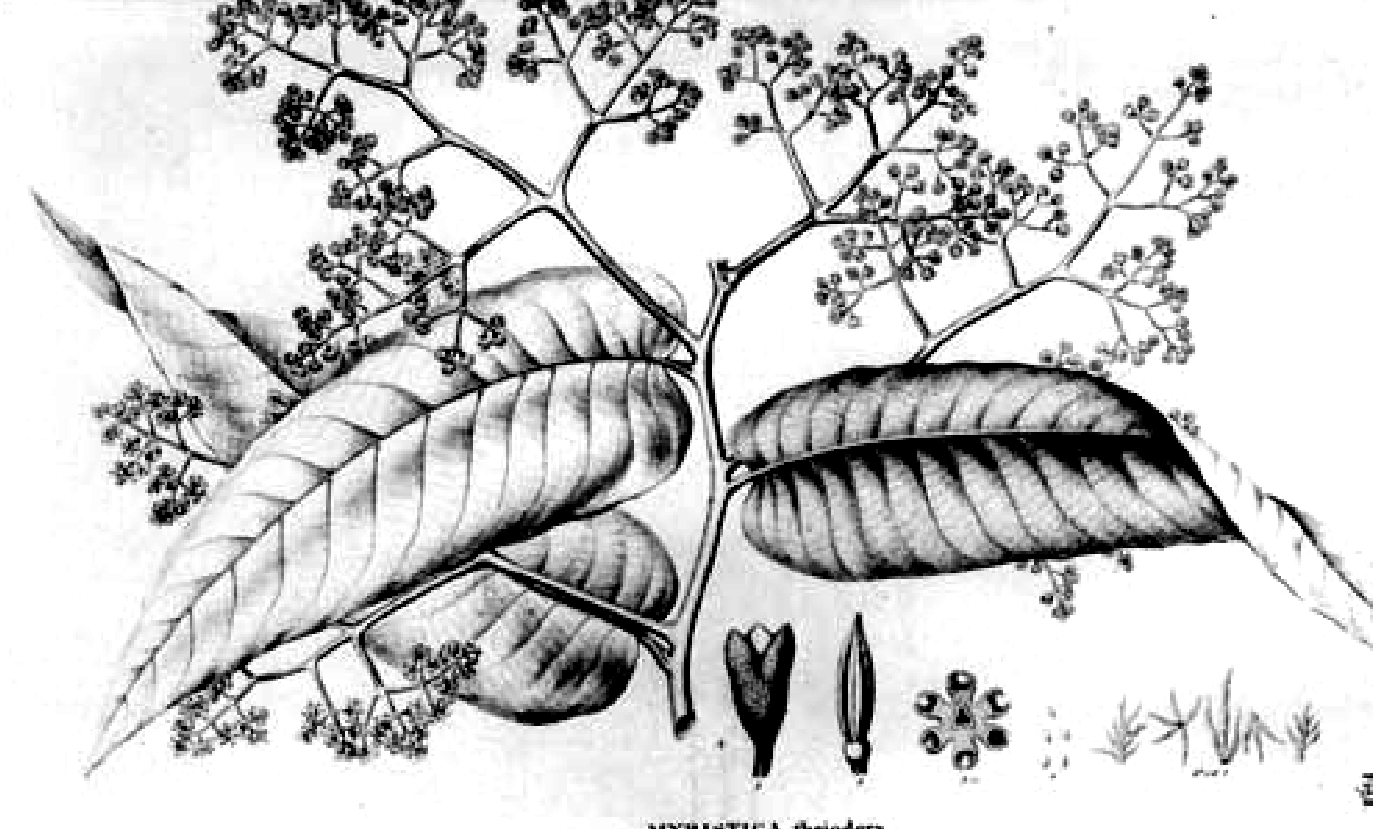
Virola theiodora

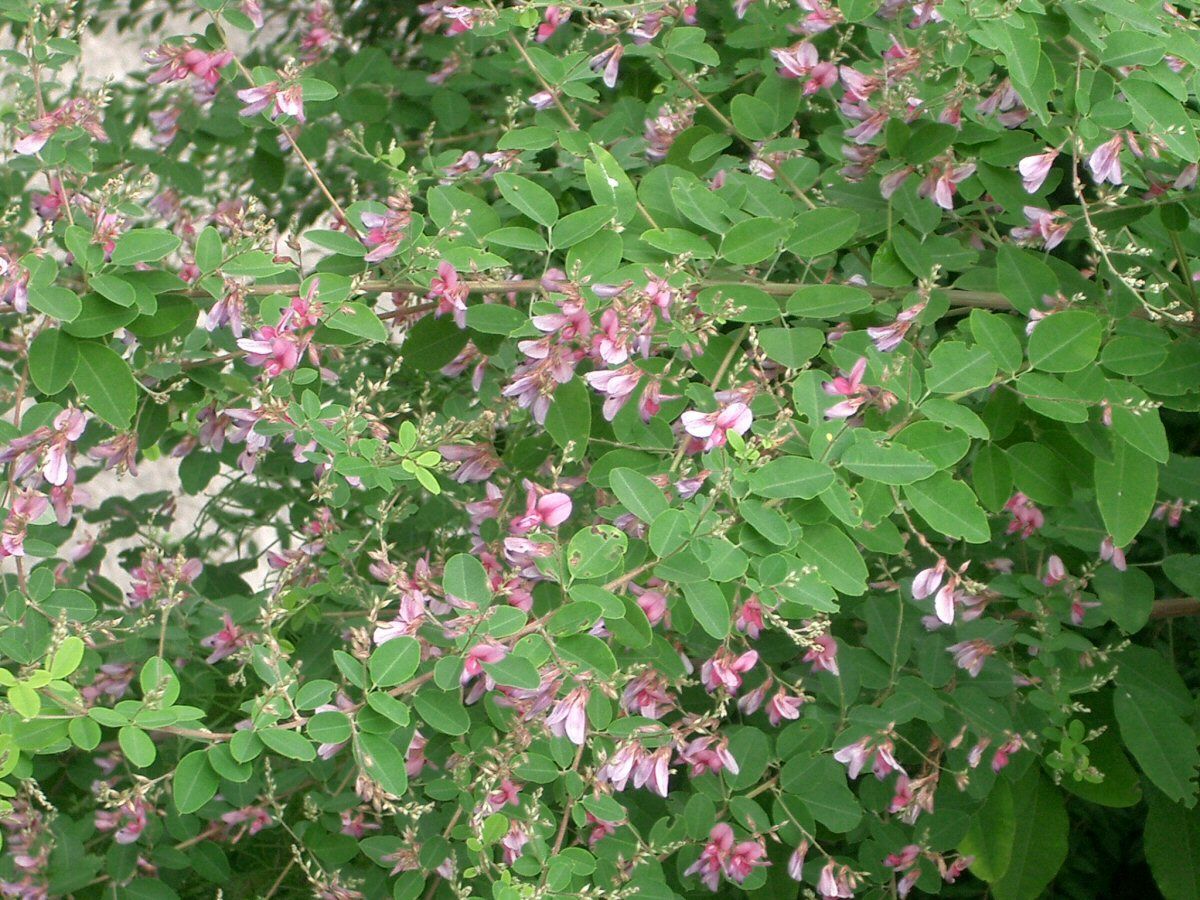
Lespedeza bicolor

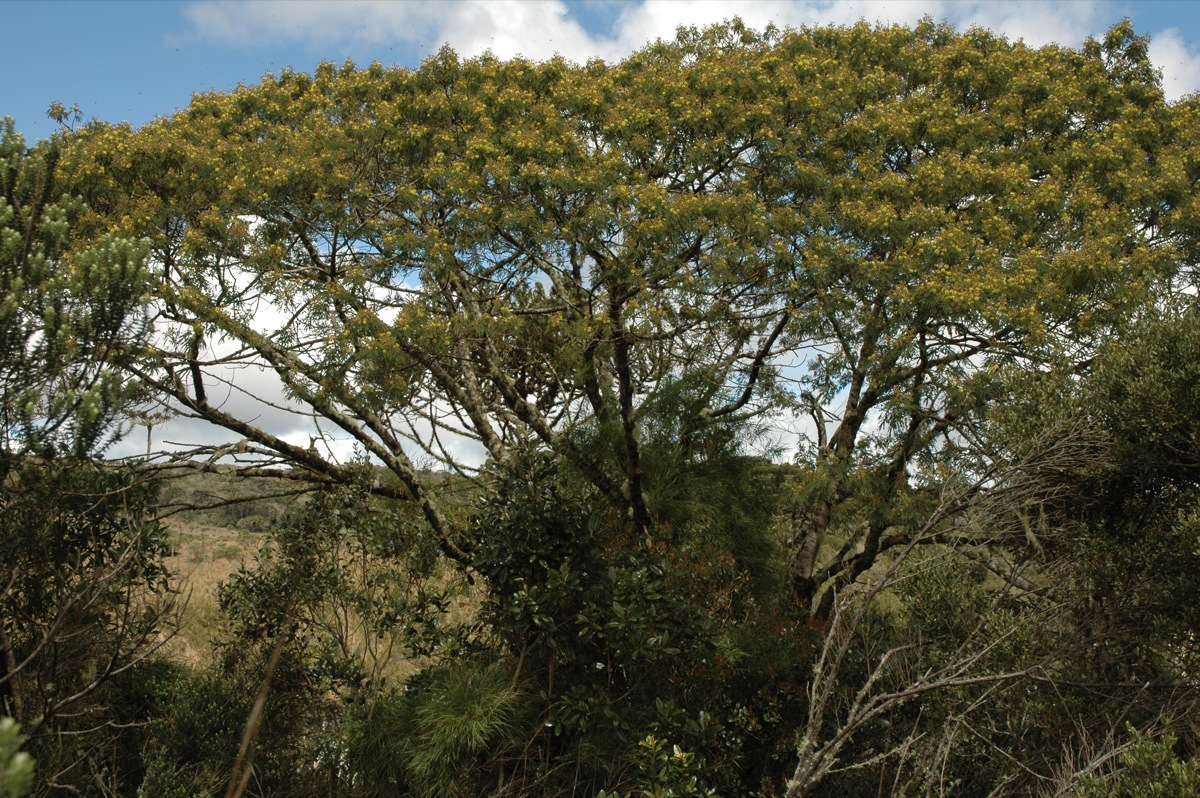
Mimosa scabrella

- Acaciella angustissima: β-methyl-phenethylamine. NMT and DMT found in leaves (1.1-10.2 ppm).
- Vachellia aroma: tryptamine alkaloids. Seeds contain significant amounts of tryptamines.
- Acacia auriculiformis: 5-MeO-DMT in stem bark.
- Acacia baileyana: 0.02% tryptamine and β-carbolines. Tetrahydroharman is found in the leaves.
- Acacia beauverdiana: psychoactive. Ash is used in Pituri.
- Senegalia berlandieri: DMT, phenethylamine, mescaline, and nicotine.
- Vachellia caven: psychoactive.
- Acacia colei: DMT.
- Acacia complanata: 0.3% alkaloids in leaves and stems. Almost all N-methyl-tetrahydroharman, with traces of tetrahydroharman, and some of tryptamine
- Acacia confusa: DMT and NMT in leaves, stems and bark. 0.04% NMT and 0.02% DMT is found in the stems. N,N-dimethyltryptamine N-oxide is also present.
- Vachellia cornigera: psychoactive. Tryptamines and DMT, according to C. Rastch.
- Acacia cultriformis: tryptamine is found in the leaves, stems, and seeds. Phenethylamine is also found in the leaves and seeds.
- Acacia cuthbertsonii: psychoactive.
- Acacia decurrens: psychoactive, but less than 0.02% alkaloids.
- Acacia delibrata: psychoactive.
- Acacia falcata: psychoactive, but less than 0.02% alkaloids.
- Vachellia farnesiana: traces of 5-MeO-DMT are present in fruit. β-methyl-phenethylamine is found in the flowers. Ether extracts about 2–6% of the dried leaf mass. Alkaloids are present in the bark and leaves.
- Acacia floribunda: tryptamine and phenethylamine are found in flowers. Other tryptamines, DMT, and NMT 0.3–0.4% are found in the phyllodes.
- Acacia georginae: psychoactive. Contains deadly toxins.
- Vachellia horrida: psychoactive.
- Acacia implexa: psychoactive.
- Mimosa jurema: DMT and NMT.
- Senegalia laeta: DMT is present in the leaves.
- Acacia longifolia: 0.2% tryptamine in the bark, leaves, and flowers. Phenylethylamine is found in the flowers. 0.2% DMT in plant. Histamine alkaloids.
- Acacia sophorae: tryptamine is in the leaves and bark.
- Acacia macradenia: tryptamine.
- Acacia maidenii: 0.6% NMT and DMT in about a 2:3 ratio in the stem bark. Both are present in the leaves.
- Acacia mangium: psychoactive.
- Acacia melanoxylon: DMT in the bark and leaves, but less than 0.02% total alkaloids.
- Senegalia mellifera: DMT contained in the leaves.
- Vachellia nilotica: DMT contained in the leaves.
- Acacia neurophylla: DMT is in the bark. Harman is in the leaves.
- Acacia obtusifolia: tryptamine, DMT, NMT, and other tryptamines. 0.4–0.5% in dried bark, 0.15–0.2% in leaves, and 0.07% in the branch tips.
- Vachellia oerfota: less than 0.1% DMT in leaves, NMT.
- Acacia penninervis: psychoactive.
- Acacia phlebophylla: 0.3% DMT in leaves, NMT.
- Acacia podalyriifolia: tryptamine in the leaves, 0.5% to 2% DMT in fresh bark, and phenethylamine in trace amounts. Although this species is claimed to contain 0.5% to 2% DMT in fresh bark, the reference for this is invalid as there is no reference to Acacia podalyriffolia anywhere in the reference article. Additionally, well known and proven extraction techniques for DMT have failed to produce any DMT or alkaloids from the fresh bark or leaves on multiple samples taken at various seasons. Should DMT actually exist in this species of Acacia, then it exists in extremely small amounts and attempts to produce any alkaloids with Acid/Base extraction techniques using HCl/NaOH have failed. On the same note, more academic research is definitely required into the DMT content of this and other Australian Acacia species with proper chemical analysis of sample.
- Senegalia polyacantha: DMT in leaves, and other tryptamines in leaves and bark.
- Senegalia polyacantha ssp. campylacantha: less than 0.2% DMT in leaves, NMT; DMT and other tryptamines are present in the leaves and bark.
- Senegalia rigidula: phenethylamine, tryptamine, tyramine, and β-Methylphenethylamine.
- Acacia sassa: psychoactive.
- Vachellia schaffneri: β-methyl-phenethylamine, phenethylamine.
- Senegalia senegal: less than 0.1% DMT in leaf, NMT, and other tryptamines. DMT is present within the plant and bark.
- Vachellia seyal: DMT in the leaves. Ether extracts about 1–7% of the dried leaf mass.
- Vachellia sieberiana: DMT in the leaves.
- Acacia simplex: DMT and NMT in the leaves and stem and trunk bark. DMT is present at a concentration of 0.81% within the bark. MMT is also present.
- Vachellia tortilis: DMT, NMT, and other tryptamines.
- Acacia vestita: tryptamine in the leaves and stems, but less than 0.02% total alkaloids
- Acacia victoriae: tryptamines, and 5-MeO-alkyltryptamine.
- List of acacia species having little or no alkaloids in the material sampled:
  (Concentration of alkaloids between 0% and 0.02%)
  - Acacia acinacea
  - Acacia baileyana
  - Acacia decurrens
  - Acacia dealbata
  - Acacia mearnsii
  - Acacia drummondii
  - Acacia elata
  - Acacia falcata
  - Acacia leprosa
  - Acacia linearis
  - Acacia melanoxylon
  - Acacia pycnantha
  - Acacia retinodes
  - Acacia saligna
  - Acacia stricta
  - Acacia verticillata
  - Acacia vestita
- Pseudalbizzia inundata: leaves contain DMT.
- Anadenanthera colubrina: bufotenin and bufotenin are present in the beans. N,N-Dimethyltryptamine is also present within the beans and pods.
- Anadenanthera colubrina var. cebil: bufotenin and dimethyltryptamine have been isolated from the seeds and seed pods. 5-MeO-DMT has been isolated from the bark of the stems. The seeds were found to contain 12.4% bufotenine, 0.06% 5-MeO-DMT, and 0.06% DMT.
- Anadenanthera peregrina:

1,2,3,4-Tetrahydro-6-methoxy-2,9-dimethyl-beta-carboline within the plant, 1,2,3,4-Tetrahydro-6-methoxy-2-methyl-beta-carboline within the plant, 5-Methoxy-N,N-dimethyltryptamine in the bark, 5-Methoxy-N-methyltryptamine within the bark, bufoteninwithin the plant and beans, bufotenin N-oxide in the fruit and beans, N,N-Dimethyltryptamine-oxide in the fruit.

- Anadenanthera peregrina var. peregrina: bufotenine is in the seeds.
- Desmanthus illinoensis: 0–0.34% DMT in root bark, though highly variable. Also, NMT, N-hydroxy-N-methyltryptamine, 2-hydroxy-N-methyltryptamine, and gramine (toxic).
- Desmanthus leptolobus: 0.14% DMT in root bark, more reliable than D. illinoensis.
- Desmodium caudatum (syn. Ohwia caudata) Roots: 0.087% DMT.
- Desmodium racemosum: 5-MeO-DMT.
- Desmodium triflorum: 0.0004% DMT-N-oxide in the roots, with less in the stems, and trace amounts in the leaves.
- Lespedeza capitata
- Lespedeza bicolor: DMT, lespedamine, and 5-MeO-DMT in leaves and roots.
- Lespedeza bicolor var. japonica: DMT and 5-MeO-DMT in leaves and root bark.
- Mimosa ophthalmocentra, dried root: DMT 1.6%, NMT 0.0012%, and hordenine 0.0065%.
- Mimosa scabrella: tryptamine, NMT, DMT, and N-methyltetrahydrocarboline in bark
- Mimosa tenuiflora (syn. "Mimosa hostilis"): 1-1.7% DMT (dry root bark).
- Mimosa verrucosa: DMT in root bark
- Mucuna pruriens: the seeds of the plant contain 3.1–6.1% L-DOPA.
- Petalostylis casseoides: 0.4–0.5% tryptamine, DMT, etc. in leaves and stems.
- Petalostylis labicheoides var. casseoides: DMT in leaves and stems, 0.4–0.5% alkaloids in leaves and stems, tryptamines in leaves and stems, and MAO's up to 0.5%.
- Phyllodium pulchellum (syn. Desmodium pulchellum): 0.2% 5-MeO-DMT and small quantities of DMT. DMT (dominates in seedlings and young plants) and 5-MeO-DMT (dominates in mature plant) are found within the whole plant, roots, stems, leaves, and flowers.
- Zornia latifolia: the flavones genistein, apigenin, and syzalterin may explain the cannabis-like effects.

=== Lauraceae ===
- Nectandra megapotamica: NMT.

=== Malpighiaceae ===
- Diplopterys cabrerana: McKenna et al. (1984) assayed and found the leaves contain 0.17% DMT.

=== Myristicaceae ===
- Horsfieldia superba: 5-MeO-DMT, horsfiline, and beta-carbolines.
- Iryanthera macrophylla: 5-MeO-DMT in bark.
- Iryanthera ulei: 5-MeO-DMT in bark.
- Osteophloem platyspermum: DMT, 5-MeO-DMT in bark.
- Virola calophylla: leaves contain 0.149% DMT and 0.006% MMT. 5-MeO-DMT is found in bark.
- Virola calophylloidea: DMT and 5-MeO-DMT.
- Virola carinata: DMT in leaves. 5-MeO-DMT.
- Virola cuspidata: DMT'
- Virola divergens: DMT in leaves'
- Virola melinonii: DMT in bark. 5-MeO-DMT.
- Virola multinervia: DMT and 5-MeO-DMT in bark and roots.
- Virola pavonis: DMT in leaves.
- Virola peruviana: 5-MeO-DMT, traces of DMT, and 5-MeO-tryptamine are found in bark.
- Virola rufula: alkaloids in bark and roots, 95% of which is MeO-DMT. 0.190% 5-MeO-DMT in bark, 0.135% 5-MeO-DMT in root, and 0.092% DMT in leaves.
- Virola sebifera: the bark contains 0.065% to 0.25% alkaloids, most of which are DMT and 5-MeO-DMT.
- Virola theiodora: DMT and 5-MeO-DMT in bark, roots, leaves, and flowers.
- Virola venosa: DMT and 5-MeO-DMT in roots and leaves.

=== Ochnaceae ===
- Testulea gabonensis: 0.2% 5-MeO-DMT, NMT, and small quantities of DMT. DMT in bark and root bark.

=== Pandanaceae ===
- Genus Pandanus (Screw Pine): DMT in nuts.

=== Poaceae (Gramineae) ===
Some Graminae (grass) species contain gramine, which can cause brain damage, other organ damage, central nervous system damage, and death in sheep.

- Arundo donax: 0.0057% DMT in dried rhizome. 0.026% bufotenine and 0.0023% 5-MeO-MMT.
- Phalaris aquatica: 0.0007–0.18% total alkaloids. 0.100% DMT, 0.022% 5-MeO-DMT, and 0.005% 5-OH-DMT.
- Phalaris arundinacea: 0.0004–0.121% total alkaloids.
- Phalaris brachystachys: aerial parts up to 3% total alkaloids, DMT present.
- Phalaris coerulescens: coerulescine and 2-methyl-1,2,3,4-Tetrahydro-β-carboline in rhizome.
- Phragmites australis: DMT, 5-MeO-DMT, bufotenine, and gramine in the rhizome.

None of the above alkaloids are said to have been found in Phalaris californica, Phalaris canariensis, Phalaris minor, and hybrids of P. arundinacea, together with P. aquatica.

=== Polygonaceae ===
- Eriogonum: DMT.

=== Rubiaceae ===
- Psychotria carthagenensis: 0.2% average DMT in dried leaves.
- Psychotria colorata: presence of mu opioid receptor (MOR) agonist and NMDA antagonist: hodgkinsine and psychotridine. Also mentioned in The Encyclopedia of Psychoactive Plants: Ethnopharmacology and Its Applications.
- Psychotria expansa: DMT.
- Psychotria forsteriana: DMT.
- Psychotria insularum: DMT.
- Psychotria poeppigiana: DMT.
- Psychotria rostrata: DMT.
- Psychotria rufipilis: DMT.
- Psychotria viridis: DMT 0.1–0.61% dried mass.

=== Rutaceae ===
- Dictyoloma incanescens: 5-MeO-DMT in leaves and 0.04% 5-MeO-DMT in bark.
- Dutaillyea drupacea: > 0.4% 5-MeO-DMT in leaves.
- Dutaillyea oreophila: 5-MeO-DMT in leaves
- Tetradium ruticarpum (syn. Evodia rutaecarpa): 5-MeO-DMT in leaves, fruit, and roots.
- Limonia acidissima: traces of DMT. 5-MeO-DMT in stems.
- Euodia leptococca (formerly Melicope): 0.2% total alkaloids, 0.07% 5-MeO-DMT in leaves and stems. Also, "5-MeO-DMT-Oxide and a beta-carboline"
- Pilocarpus organensis: DMT and 5-MeO-DMT in leaves (might also contain pilocarpine).
- Vepris ampody: up to 0.2% DMT in leaves and branches.
- Zanthoxylum arborescens: traces of DMT in leaves.
- Zanthoxylum procerum: DMT in leaves.
- Citrus limon: DMT and N-Methylated tryptamine derivative in leaves.
- Citrus sinesis: DMT and N-Methylated tryptamine derivative.
- Citrus bergamia: DMT and N-Methylated tryptamine derivative.
- Mandarin orange: traces of N-methylated tryptamine derivative in leaves.
- Chinotto Tree: N-Methylated tryptamine derivative in leaves.
- Citrus medica: N-Methylated tryptamine derivative in leaves.

== Phenethylamines ==
Mescaline molecule

DMPEA molecule

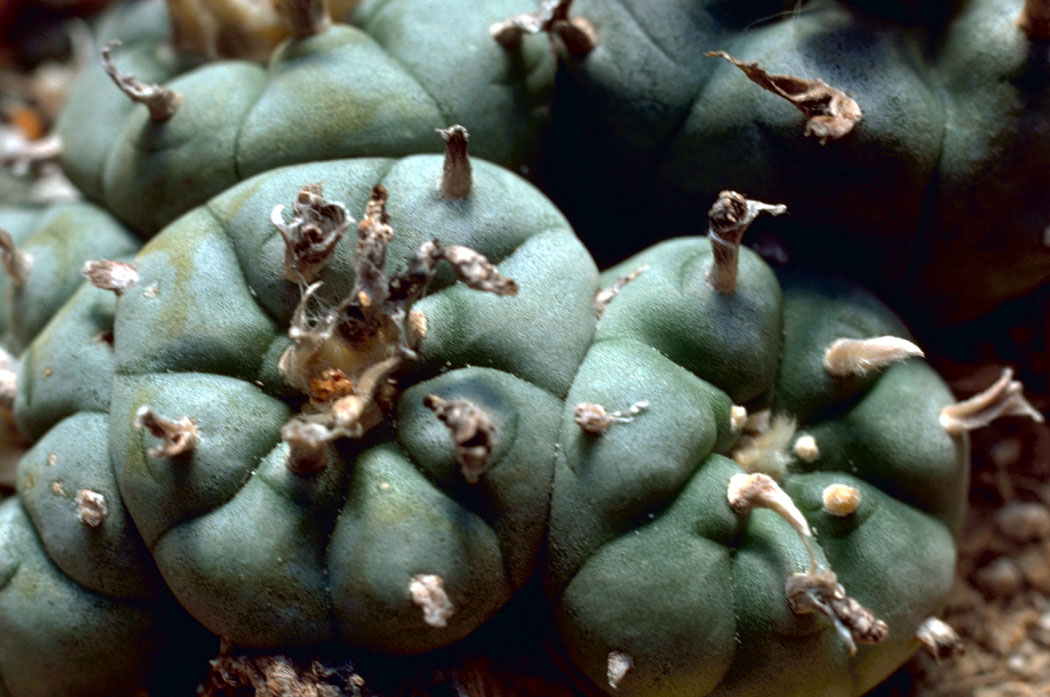
Peyote

Species, Alkaloid Content (Fresh) – Alkaloid Content (Dried)

- Coryphantha contains various phenethylamine alkaloids including macromerine, coryphanthine, O-methyl-candicine, corypalmine, and N-methyl-corypalmine.
- Cylindropuntia echinocarpa (syn. Opuntia echinocarpa): mescaline 0.01%, DMPEA 0.01%, and 4-hydroxy-3-5-dimethoxyphenethylamine 0.01%.
- Cylindropuntia spinosior (syn. Opuntia spinosior): mescaline 0.00004%, 3-methoxytyramine 0.001%, tyramine 0.002%, and 3-4-dimethoxyphenethylamine.
- Echinopsis lageniformis (syns Echinopsis scopulicola, Trichocereus bridgesii): mescaline > 0.025%, DMPEA < 1%, 3-methoxytyramine < 1%, tyramine < 1%.
- Echinopsis macrogona (syn. Trichocereus macrogonus): > 0.01–0.05% mescaline
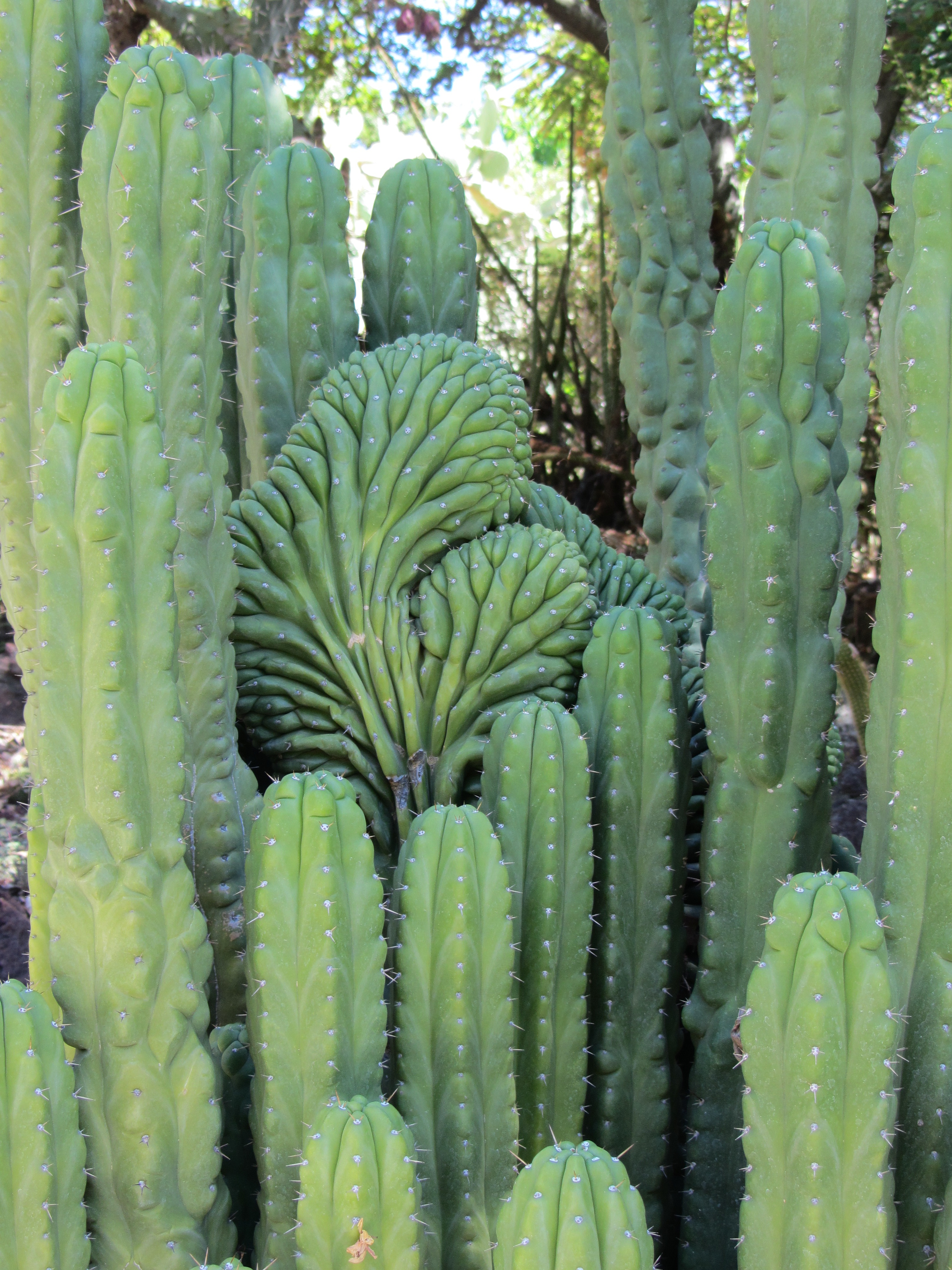
- Echinopsis pachanoi
  Echinopsis pachanoi (syn. Trichocereus pachanoi): mescaline 0.006–0.12%, 0.05% average; mescaline 0.01%–2.375%
- Echinopsis peruviana (syn. Trichocereus peruvianus): mescaline 0.0005%–0.12%; mescaline
- Echinopsis spachiana (syn. Trichocereus spachianus): mescaline.
- Echinopsis tacaquirensis subsp. taquimbalensis (syn. Trichocereus taquimbalensis): > 0.005–0.025% mescaline.
- Echinopsis terscheckii (syn. Trichocereus terscheckii, Trichocereus werdemannianus): > 0.005–0.025% mescaline. mescaline 0.01%–2.375%
- Echinopsis valida: 0.025% mescaline.
- Lophophora williamsii (Peyote): 0.4% mescaline. 3–6% mescaline.
- Opuntia acanthocarpa: mescaline.
- Opuntia basilaris: mescaline 0.01% and 4-hydroxy-3-5-dimethoxyphenethylamine.
- Pelecyphora aselliformis: mescaline.

== Isoquinolines ==
While this chemical class includes morphinan structures, you can refer to the dedicated section: List of psychoactive plants § Opiates.

=== Amaryllidaceae ===
Hallucinogenic plant, such as Boophone disticha: chemical mixture buphanine (deliriants).

== Beta-carbolines ==
Harmaline, a beta-carboline

Harmalol molecule

THH molecule

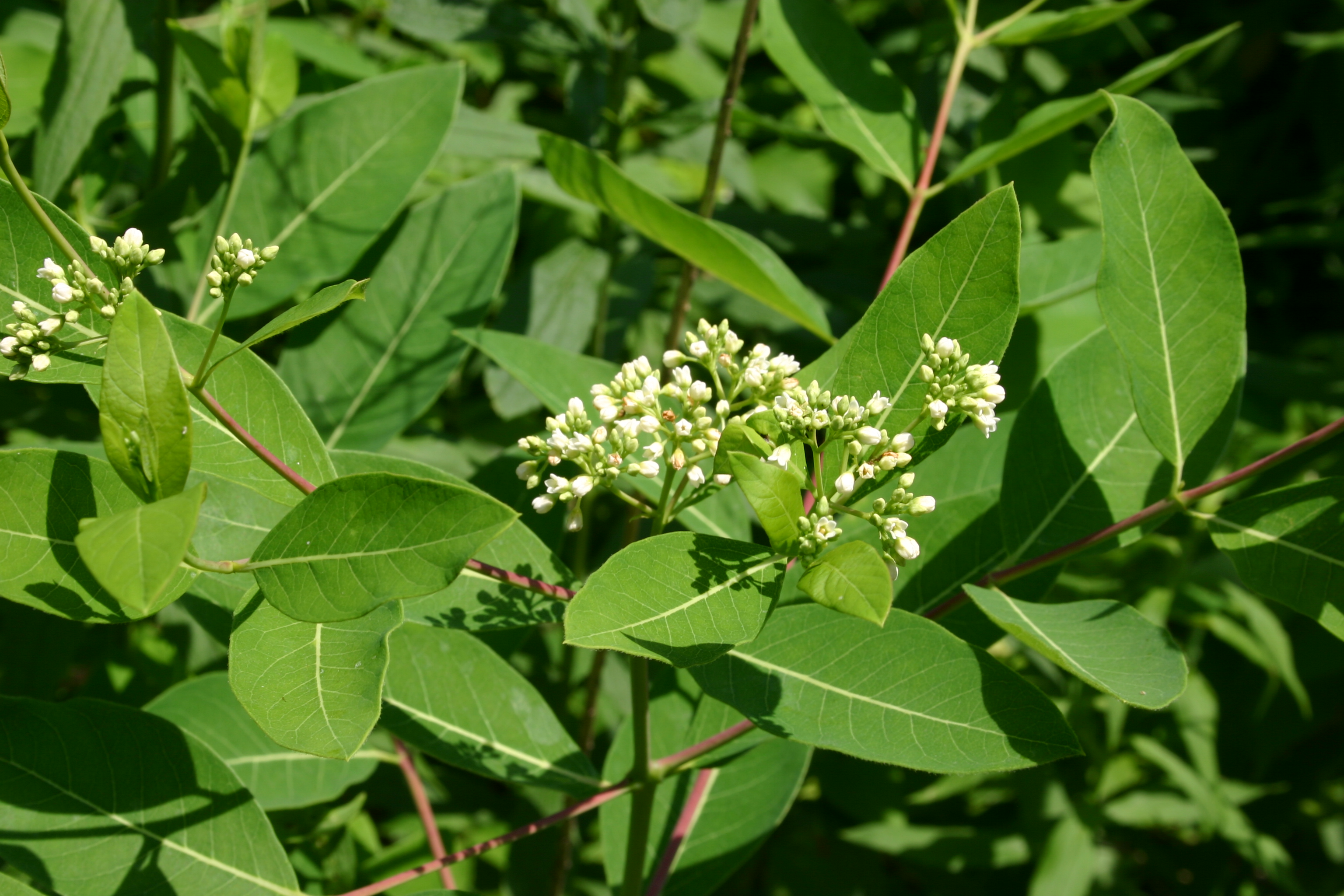
Apocynum cannabinum

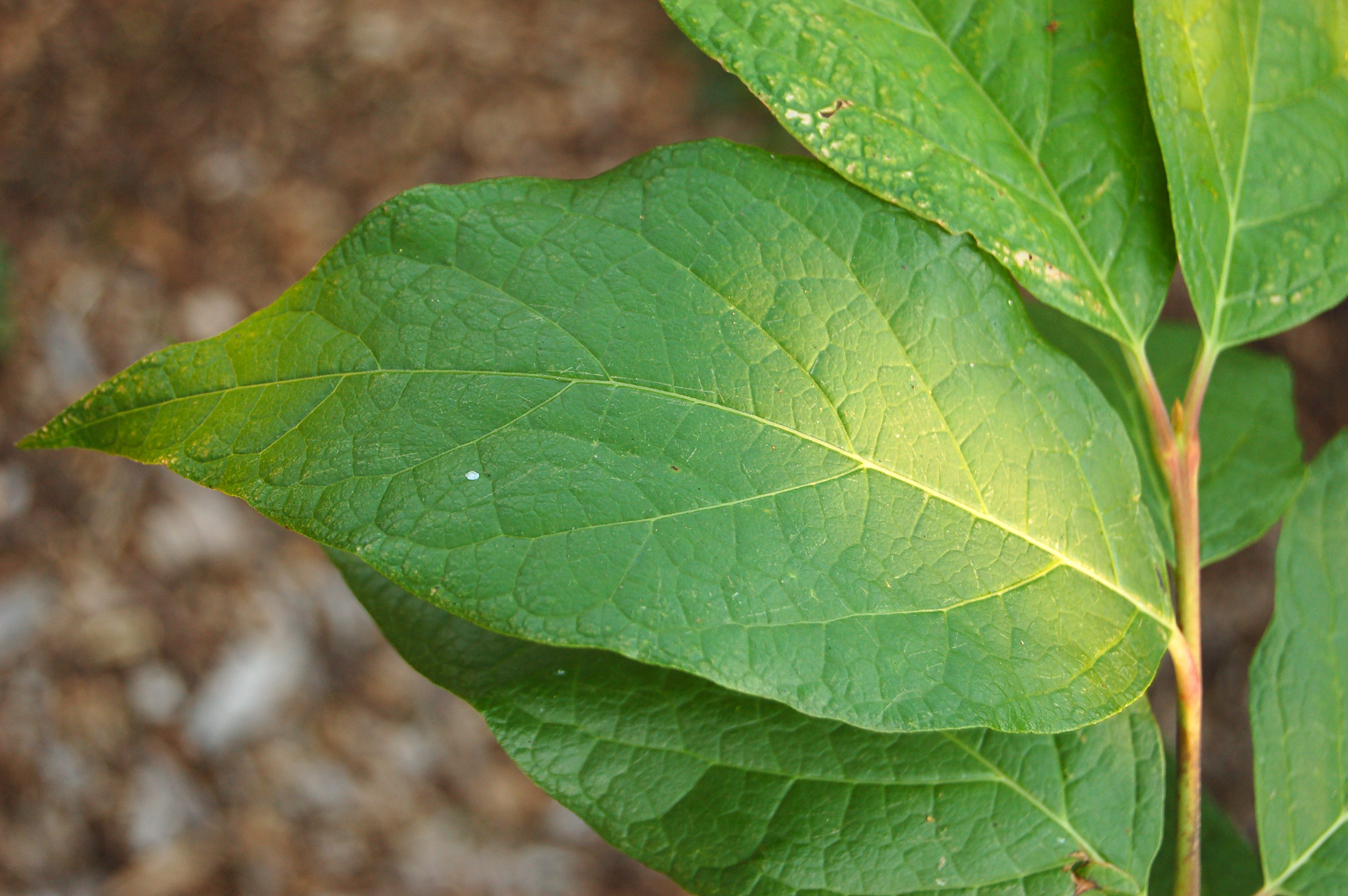
Calycanthus

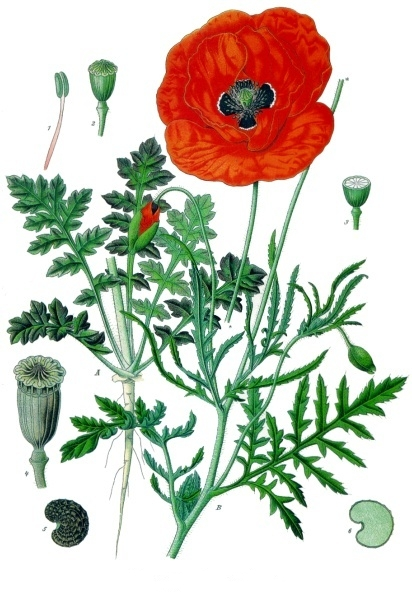
Koeh

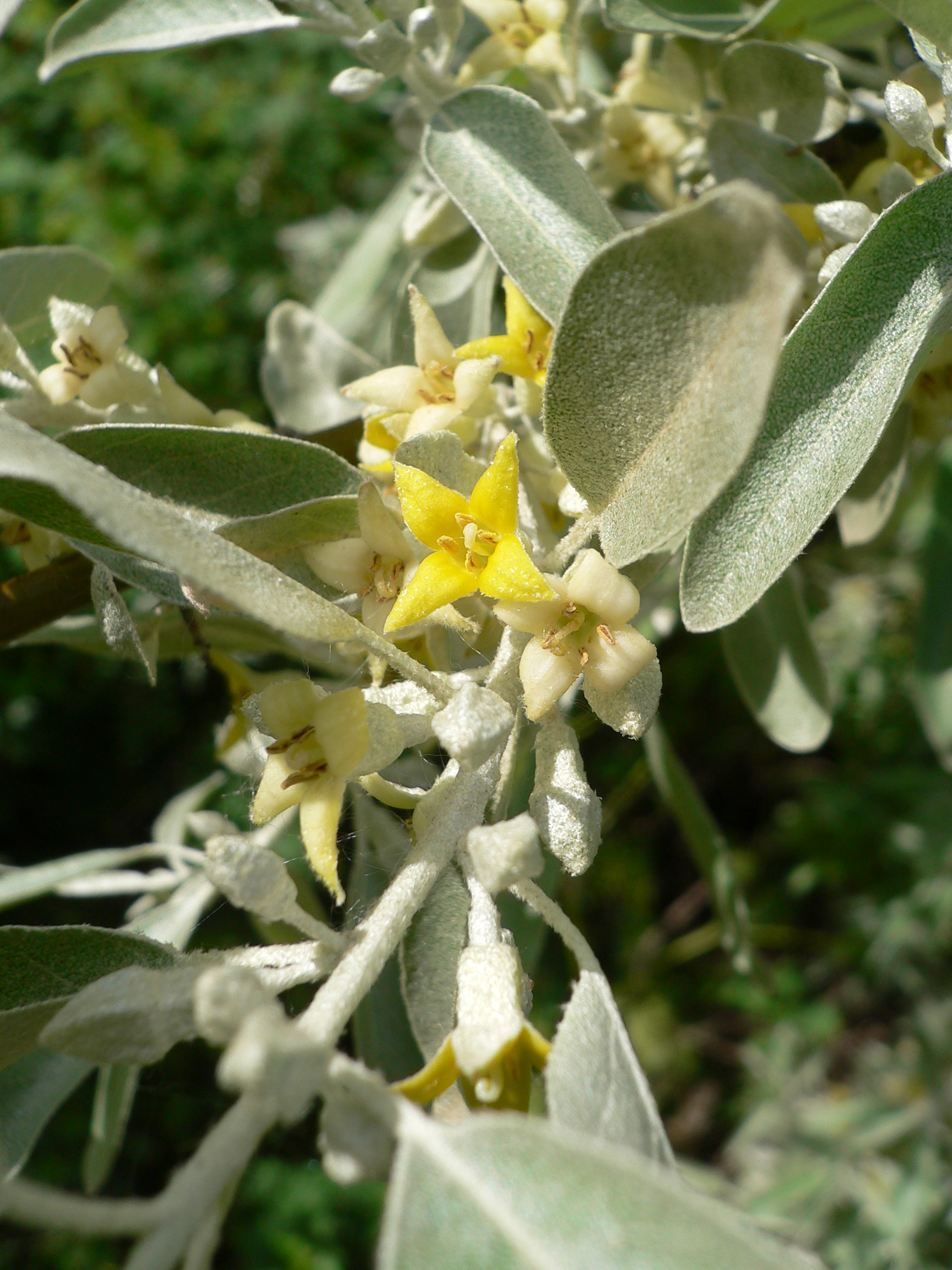
Elaeagnus angustifolia

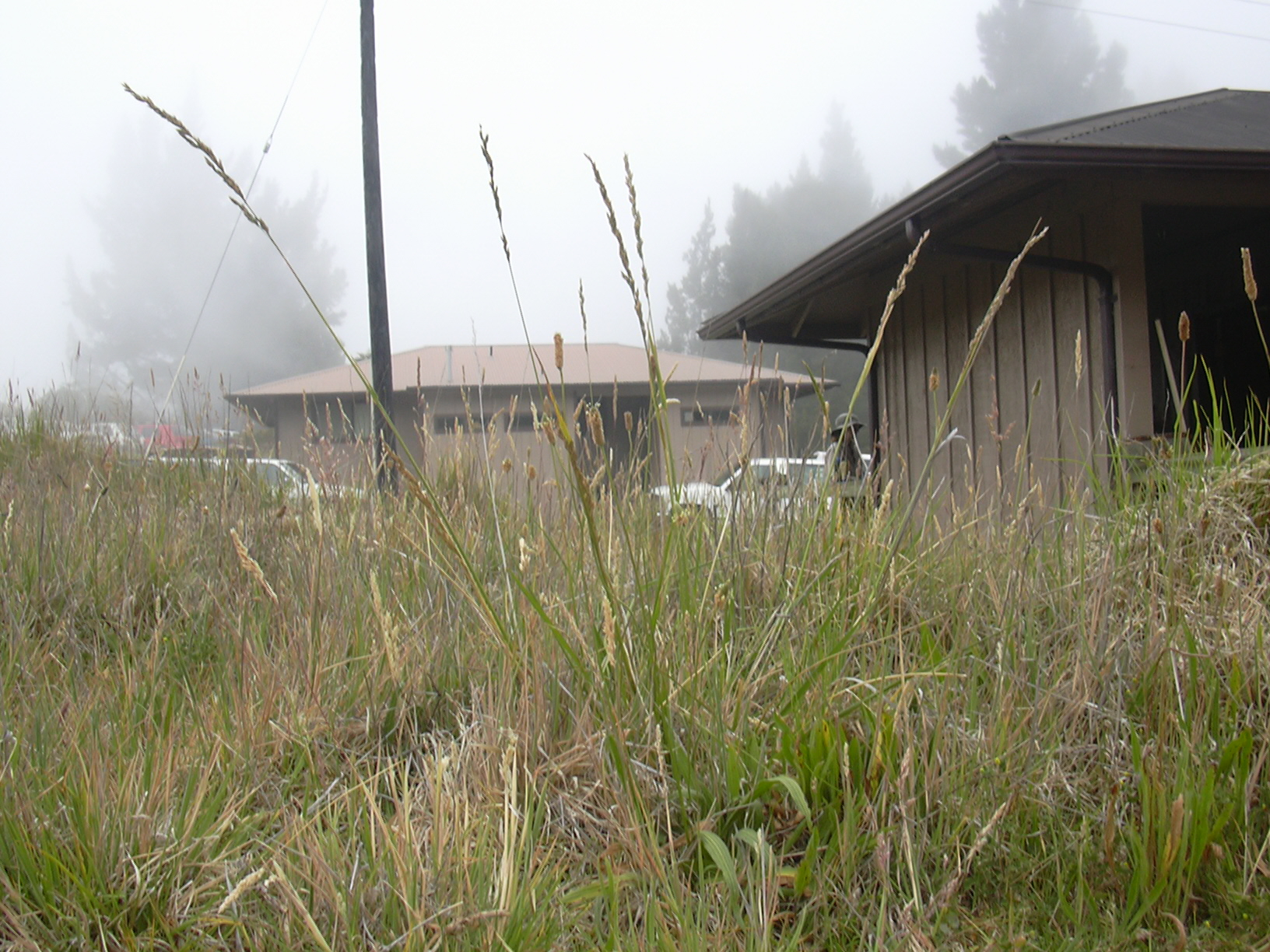
Festuca arundinacea

Beta-carbolines are "reversible" MAO-A inhibitors. They are found in some plants used to make Ayahuasca. In high doses the harmala alkaloids are somewhat hallucinogenic on their own. β-carboline is a benzodiazepine receptor inverse agonist and can therefore have convulsive, anxiogenic, and memory enhancing effects.

=== Apocynaceae ===
- Amsonia tabernaemontana: harman.
- Aspidosperma exalatum: beta-carbolines.
- Aspidosperma polyneuron: beta-carbolines.
- Apocynum cannabinum, :harmalol.
- Ochrosia nakaiana; harman.
- Pleiocarpa mutica: beta-carbolines.

=== Bignoniaceae ===
- Newbouldia laevis: harman.

=== Calycanthaceae ===
- Calycanthus occidentalis: harman and harmine.

=== Chenopodiaceae ===
- Hammada leptoclada: harman, Tetrahydroharman, etc.
- Kochia scoparia: harman, harmine, etc.

=== Combretaceae ===
- Guiera senegalensis: tetrahydroharmine, harman, etc.

=== Cyperaceae ===
- Carex brevicollis: harmine, etc.
- Carex parva: beta-carbolines.

=== Elaeagnaceae ===
- Elaeagnus angustifolia: harman, etc.
- Elaeagnus commutata: beta-carbolines.
- Elaeagnus hortensis: tetrahydroharman, etc.
- Elaeagnus orientalis: tetrahydroharman.
- Elaeagnus spinosa: tetrahydroharman.
- Hippophae rhamnoides: harman, etc.
- Shepherdia argentea: tetrahydroharmol.
- Shepherdia canadensis: tetrahydroharmol.

=== Gramineae ===
- Arundo donax: tetrahydroharman, etc.
- Festuca arundinacea: harman, etc.
- Lolium perenne (perennial ryegrass): harman, etc.
- Phalaris aquatica: beta-carbolines.
- Phalaris arundinacea: beta-carbolines.

=== Lauraceae ===
- Nectandra megapotamica: beta-carbolines.

=== Leguminosae ===
- Acacia baileyana: tetrahydroharman.
- Acacia complanata: tetrahydroharman, etc.
- Burkea africana: harman, etc.
- Desmodium gangeticum: beta-carbolines.
- Desmodium gyrans: beta-carbolines.
- Mucuna pruriens: 6-methoxyharman, dihydroharman, and harman.
- Petalostylis labicheoides: tetrahydroharman. MAOs up to 0.5%.
- Prosopis nigra: harmalicin, harman, etc.
- Shepherdia pulchellum: beta-carbolines.

=== Loganiaceae ===
- Strychnos melinoniana: beta-carbolines.
- Strychnos usambarensis: harman.

=== Malpighiaceae ===
- Banisteriopsis argentia: 5-methoxytetrahydroharman, (−)-N(6)-methoxytetrahydroharman, and dimethyltryptamine-N(6)-oxide.
- Banisteriopsis caapi: harmine 0.31–0.84%, tetrahydroharmine, telepathine, and dihydroshihunine, 5-MeO-DMT in bark,
- Banisteriopsis inebrians: beta-carbolines.
- Banisteriopsis lutea: harmine, telepathine.
- Banisteriopsis metallicolor: harmine, telepathine.
- Banisteriopsis muricata: harmine up to 6%, harmaline up to 4%, plus DMT.
- Diplopterys cabrerana: beta-carbolines.
- Cabi pratensis: beta-carbolines.
- Callaeum antifebrile(syn. Cabi paraensis): harmine.
- Tetrapterys methystica
- Tetrapterys mucronata

=== Myristicaceae ===
- Gymnacranthera paniculata: beta-carbolines.
- Horsfieldia superba: beta-carbolines.
- Virola cuspidata: 6-methoxyharman.
- Virola rufula: beta-carbolines.
- Virola theiodora: beta-carbolines.

=== Ochnaceae ===
- Testulea gabonensis: beta-carbolines.

=== Palmae ===
- Plectocomiopsis geminiflora: beta-carbolines.

=== Papaveraceae ===
- Meconopsis horridula: beta-carbolines.
- Meconopsis napaulensis: beta-carbolines.
- Meconopsis paniculata: beta-carbolines.
- Meconopsis robusta: beta-carbolines.
- Meconopsis rudis: beta-carbolines.
- Papaver rhoeas: beta-carbolines.
- Papaver Bracteatum: thebaine and tefamine.
- Papaver paeoniflorum: morphine.
- Papaver setigerum: morphine.
- Papaver somniferum: morphine, codeine, thebaine, papaverine, noscapine, narcotine, and narceine.

=== Passifloraceae ===
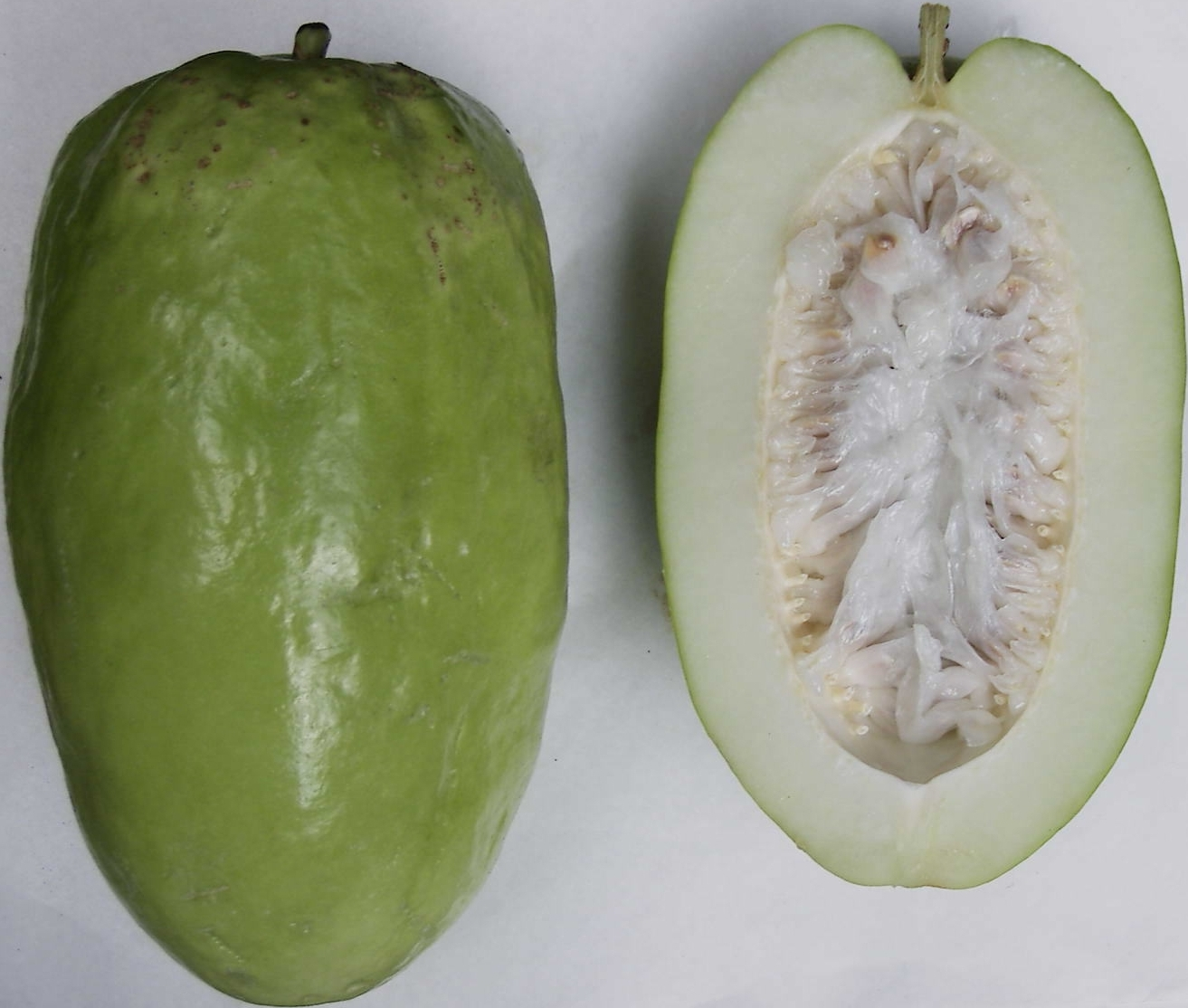
Badea

- Passiflora actinia: harman.
- Passiflora alata: harman.
- Passiflora alba: harman.
- Passiflora bryonoides: harman.
- Passiflora caerulea: harman.
- Passiflora capsularis: harman.
- Passiflora decaisneana: harman.
- Passiflora edulis: harman 0–7001 ppm in fruit.
- Passiflora eichleriana: harman.
- Passiflora foetida: harman.
- Passiflora incarnata (with bee): harmine, harmaline, harman, etc. 0.03%. Alkaloids in rind of fruit 0.25%.
- Passiflora quadrangularis: harman.
- Passiflora ruberosa: harman.
- Passiflora subpeltata: harman.
- Passiflora warmingii: harman.

=== Polygonaceae ===
- Calligonum minimum: beta-carbolines.
- Leptactinia densiflora: tetrahydroharmine, etc.
- Ophiorrhiza japonica: harman.
- Pauridiantha callicarpoides: harman.
- Pauridiantha dewevrei: harman.
- Pauridiantha lyalli: harman.
- Pauridiantha viridiflora: harman.
- Simira klugei: harman.
- Simira rubra: harman.

=== Rubiaceae ===
- Borreria verticillata: beta-carbolines.
- Leptactinia densiflora: beta-carbolines.
- Nauclea diderrichii: beta-carbolines.
- Ophiorrhiza japonica: beta-carbolines.
- Pauridiantha callicarpoides: beta-carbolines.
- Pauridiantha dewevrei: beta-carbolines.
- Pauridiantha yalli: beta-carbolines.
- Pauridiantha viridiflora: beta-carbolines.
- Pavetta lanceolata: beta-carbolines.
- Psychotria carthagenensis: beta-carbolines.
- Psychotria viridis: beta-carbolines.
- Simira klugei: beta-carbolines.
- Simira rubra: beta-carbolines.
- Uncaria attenuata: beta-carbolines.
- Uncaria canescens: beta-carbolines.
- Uncaria orientalis: beta-carbolines.

=== Rutaceae ===
- Tetradium (syn. Evodia) species: some contain carbolines.
- Euodia leptococca: beta-carboline.
- Araliopsis tabouensis: beta-carbolines.
- Flindersia laevicarpa: beta-carbolines.
- Xanthoxylum rhetsa: beta-carbolines.

=== Sapotaceae ===
- Chrysophyllum lacourtianum: norharman, etc.
- Scutellaria nana

=== Simaroubaceae ===
- Ailanthus malabarica: beta-carbolines. (See also Nag Champa)
- Perriera madagascariensis: beta-carbolines.
- Picrasma ailanthoides: beta-carbolines.
- Picrasma crenata: beta-carbolines.
- Picrasma excelsa: beta-carbolines.
- Picrasma javanica: beta-carbolines.

=== Solanaceae ===
- Vestia foetida (Syn V. lycioides): beta-carbolines.

=== Symplocaceae ===
- Symplocos racemosa: harman.

=== Tiliaceae ===
- Grewia mollis: beta-carbolines.

=== Zygophyllaceae ===
- Fagonia cretica: harman.
- Nitraria schoberi: beta-carbolines.
- Peganum harmala (Syrian Rue): The seeds contain about 2–6% alkaloids, most of which is harmaline. Peganum harmala is also an abortifacient.
- Peganum nigellastrum: harmine.
- Tribulus terrestris: harmine, harman, etc.
- Zygophyllum fabago: harmine, harman, etc.

== Opiates ==
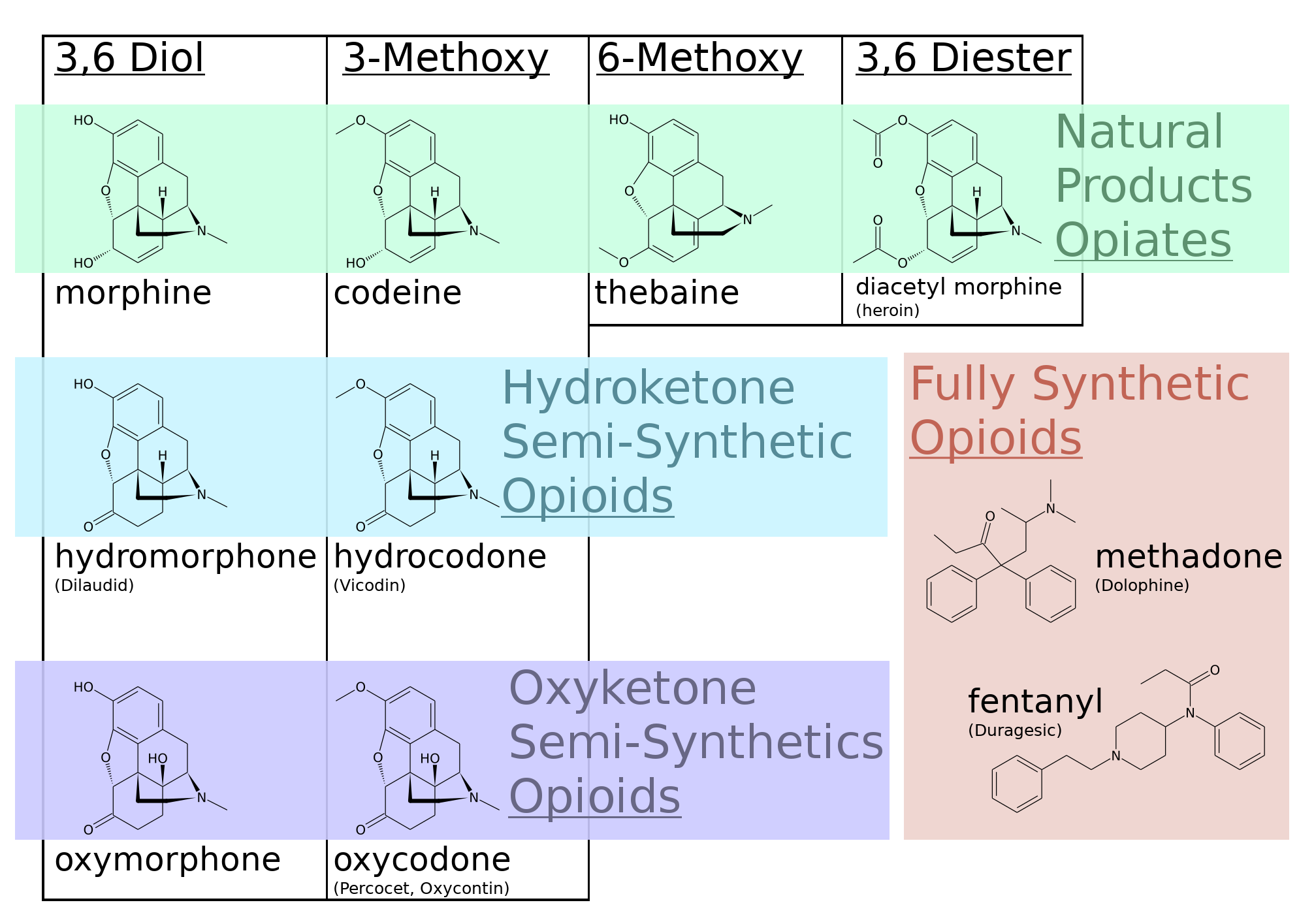
Opiates v opioids with different major subclassifications indicated

Opiates are the natural products of many plants, the most famous and historically relevant of which is Papaver somniferum. Opiates are defined as natural products (or their esters and salts that revert to the natural product in the human body), whereas opioids are defined as semi-synthetic or fully synthetic compounds that trigger the Opioid receptor of the mu sub-type. Other opiate receptors, such as kappa- and delta-opiate receptors are part of this system but do not cause the characteristic behavioral depression and analgesia which is mostly mediated through the mu-opiate receptor.

The psychoactive compounds found in the opium poppy (Papaver somniferum) include morphine, codeine, and thebaine. Opiates have long been used for a variety of medical conditions with evidence of opiate trade and use for pain relief as early as the eighth century AD. Opiates are considered drugs with moderate to high abuse potential and are listed on various "Substance-Control Schedules" under the Uniform Controlled Substances Act of the United States of America.

In 2014, between 13 and 20 million people used opiates recreationally (0.3% to 0.4% of the global population between the ages of 15 and 65). According to the CDC, from this population, there were 47,000 deaths, with a total of 500,000 deaths from 2000 to 2014. In 2016, the World Health Organization reported that 27 million people suffer from Opioid use disorder. They also reported that in 2015, 450,000 people died as a result of drug use, with between a third and a half of that number being attributed to opioids.

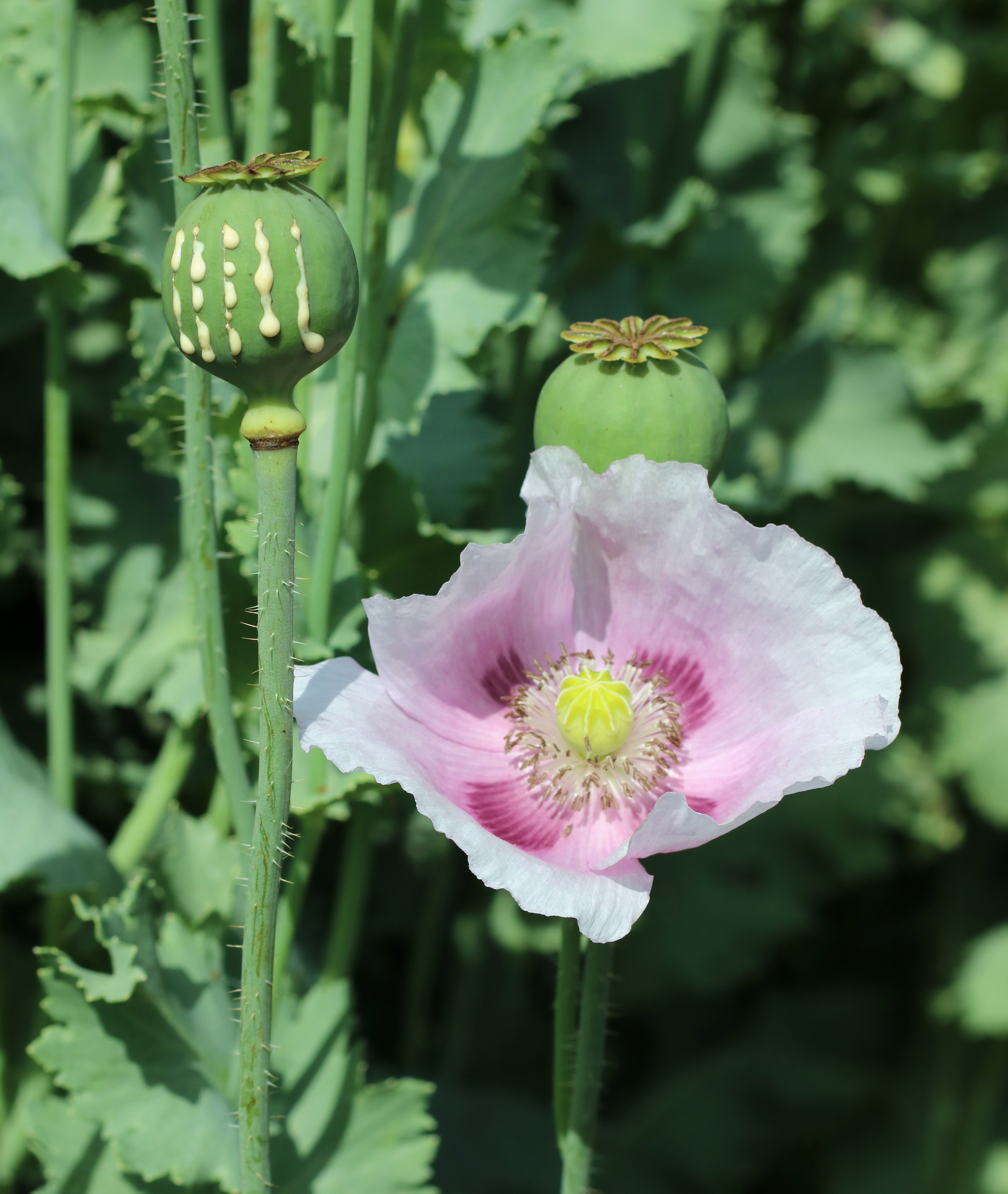
Papaver somniferum flower and scored capsule with latex.

=== Papaver somniferum ===
The plant contains a latex that thickens into opium when it is dried. Opium contains approximately 40 alkaloids, which are summarized as opium alkaloids. The main psychoactive alkaloids are:

- Morphine: 3 to 20% in opium.
- Codeine: 0.1 to 4% in opium.
- Thebaine: 0.1 to 4% in opium.
- Noscapine: 1 to 11% in opium.
- Oripavine

=== Atherospermataceae ===
- Laurelia novae-zelandiae: pukateine.
- Cnidium officinale

=== Mitragyna speciosa ===
Mitragynine

7-Hydroxymitragynine

- Mitragynine: Approx. 0.33% in dried leaves.
- 7-Hydroxymitragynine

=== Picralima nitida ===
Akuammicine

Pericine

- Akuammine
- Akuammicine
- Pericine. It may also have convulsant effects.
- Akuammiline
- Akuammidine
- N-Formylakuammiline
- Picraline
- Picraphylline
- Dihydroakuammine

=== Psychotria colorata ===
Hodgkinsine

- Hodgkinsine

=== Aspidosperma spp. ===
- Akuammicine

== Plants containing other psychoactive substances ==
Plants containing other psychoactive substances
Substance(s)	Plant	Comments
Asarone	Acorus calamus	Toxic.
Yohimbine	Alchornea floribunda	α_{2}-adrenergic receptor antagonist.
Arecoline, Arecaidine	Areca catechu	GABA uptake inhibitor and stimulant.
Protopine	Argemone mexicana	Used by Chinese residents of Mexico during the early 20th century as a legal substitute for opium and currently smoked as a marijuana substitute.
Ergine, isoergine	Argyreia nervosa (Hawaiian Baby Woodrose)	Seeds contain ergine (LSA) and isoergine (iso-LSA), often 50-150X the amounts found in Ipomoea violacea. LSA and iso-LSA are psychoactive and/or hallucinogenic.
Thujone	Artemisia absinthium	Also called "wormwood". GABA receptor antagonist.
Quinoline & Aporphine alkaloids	Asimina triloba (Paw Paw)	Unknown
Tropane alkaloids (scopolamine, atropine, hyoscyamine)	Atropa belladonna	Commonly known as 'deadly nightshade'. An anticholinergic deliriant.
Tropane alkaloids (scopolamine, atropine, and hyoscyamine)	Brugmansia	Commonly known as 'angel's trumpets'. An anticholinergic deliriant.
Indole alkaloids (harmine, manacine, brunfelsamidine), Tropane alkaloids (scopolamine)	Brunfelsia	Known to cause delirium, sustained mental confusion, and possible blindness.
Unknown	Calea zacatechichi	Produces vivid dreams after smoking. It is also employed by the Chontal people as a medicinal herb against gastrointestinal disorders, and is used as an appetizer, cathartic anti-dysentery remedy, and as a fever-reducing agent. Its psychedelic properties do not become apparent until the user is asleep. Reports describe rituals that involve drinking it as a tea to induce divinatory or lucid dreams due to its properties as an oneirogen.
Caffeine	Camellia sinensis	Tea leaves used in tea. native to Asia.
Cathinone	Catha edulis	Khat, commonly chewed, produces a stimulant effect.
Vincristine	Catharanthus roseus	Catharanthus roseus is (perhaps unpleasantly) "hallucinogenic."
Unknown	Cestrum nocturnum	Commonly referred to as 'night-blooming jasmine', 'lady of the night', and 'poisonberry'. It has an unknown mechanism of action.
Caffeine	Coffea arabica	Coffee beans used in coffee. native to Africa.
Caffeine	Cola	Cola, or kola nut, a traditional additive to cola. native to Africa.
Salvinorin A	Coleus	Trace amounts of Salviorin A have been discovered in a specific variety: Electric Lime
Bulbocapnine	Corydalis solida, cava	Bulbocapnine, Nantenine, and Tetrahydropalmatine.
Tropane alkaloids (Scopolamine, Atropine)	Datura	Also known as 'thorn apple', 'devil's trumpets', 'loco weed', and 'Jimson weed'. Scopolamine and atropine are both anticholinergics which produce hallucinogenic and deliriant effects. It has an extensive history of being used recreationally.
Cytisine	Dermatophyllum	Nicotine-like effects. Partial agonist of nicotinic acetylcholine receptors (nAChRs).
Unknown	Desfontainia spinosa	Causes visions.
Nicotine	Duboisia hopwoodii	Pituri.
Unknown	Entada rheedei	African dream herb.
Ephedrine	Ephedra sinica	Ephedra.
Cocaine	Erythroxylum coca	Coca. Widely used illegal stimulant, produces hallucination in overdose. native to South America.
Unknown	Fittonia albivenis	Nerve or mosaic plant, said to produce vision of eyeballs.
Himbacine	Galbulimima belgraveana	Galbulimima belgraveana is rich in alkaloids. Twenty-eight alkaloids have been isolated, including himbacine.
Glaucine	Glaucium flavum	Hallucinogenic effects.
Possibly Cryogenine	Heimia myrtifolia	Auditory.
Possibly Cryogenine	Heimia salicifolia	Auditory.
Lobeline, Nicotine	Hippobroma longiflora	Star of Bethlehem.
Hyperforin	Hypericum perforatum	Saint John's wort.
Tropane alkaloids	Hyoscyamus	Henbane.
Caffeine, Theobromine, Dimethylxanthines	Ilex guayusa	Ilex guayusa is used as an additive to some versions of Ayahuasca. According to the Ecuadorian indigenous, it is also slightly hallucinogenic on its own, when drunk in high enough quantities.
Ergine, isoergine	Ipomoea tricolor & Ipomoea violacea	Ergine and isoergine in seeds; up to 0.12% ergine total. Produces psychedelic effects.
Lactucarium	Lactuca virosa	Lactucarium.
Lagochilin	Lagochilus inebrians	Lagochilin is thought to be responsible for the sedative, hypotensive, and hemostatic effects of this plant.
Pukateine	Laurelia novae-zelandiae	Pukateine.
Coreximine, Reticuline	Rollinia mucosa	Corexamine inhibits the enzyme dopamine β-hydroxylase, which converts dopamine to norepinephrine. Reticuline acts as a central nervous system depressant in rats and mice.
Leonurine	Leonotis leonurus	Both leaves and flowers (where most concentrated) contain Leonurine. (Effects reminiscent of marijuana).
Nicotine	Leucas aspera	Nicotine.
Leonurine	Leonotis nepetifolia	Both leaves and flowers (where most concentrated) contain Leonurine and several compounds. (Effects reminiscent of marijuana).
Lobeline	Lobelia inflata	Indian tobacco.
Unknown	Magnolia virginiana	
Tropane alkaloids (scopolamine, atropine, and hyoscyamine)	Mandragora officinarum	Mandrake has deliriant and anticholinergic properties.
Ergine	Some Mirabilis spp.	Possibly contains ergine, a hallucinogen.
Mitragynine	Mitragyna speciosa	Usually referred to as kratom. Has opioid-like and stimulant properties.
Myristicin	Myristica fragrans	Nutmeg.
Aporphine	Nelumbo nucifera	Sacred lotus.
Nepetalactone	Nepeta cataria	Catnip.
Nicotine	Nicotiana tabacum	Tobacco. Can cause hallucinations in very large doses.
, Aporphine, Apomorphine	Nymphaea caerulea	Blue lotus or lily. Recent studies have shown Nymphaea caerulea to have psychedelic properties, and may have been used as a sacrament in ancient Egypt and certain ancient South American cultures. Dosages of 5 to 10 grams of the flowers induces slight stimulation, a shift in thought processes, enhanced visual perception, and mild closed-eye visuals. Nymphaea caerulea is unrelated to Nelumbo nucifera, the Sacred Lotus, with Nymphaea in the Nymphales, one of the oldest and most basal linegages of flowering plants, and with Nelumbo in Proteales, one of the core eudicots. Their morphological similarities are entirely convergent evolution, however they apparently have convergently evolved similar biochemistry. Both Nymphaea caerulea and Nelumbo nucifera contain the alkaloids nuciferine and apomorphine, which have been recently isolated by independent labs. These psychoactive effects make Nymphaea caerulea a likely candidate (among several) for the lotus plant eaten by the mythical Lotophagi in Homer's Odyssey. Used in aromatherapy, Nymphaea caerulea is purported to have a "divine" essence, bringing euphoria, heightened awareness and tranquility. Other sources cite anti-spasmodic, sedative, purifying, and calming properties.
Ginsenosides	Panax	Ginseng.
Morphine	Papaver somniferum	Opium. Widely used analgesic. native to the Old World.
Unknown	Phytolacca americana	Narcotic and toxic when the root is consumed.
Yohimbine	Pausinystalia johimbe	α_{2}-adrenergic receptor antagonist.
Unknown	Pedicularis densiflora	Indian warrior.
Kavalactones	Piper methysticum	An anxiolytic and hypnotic. Often advertised as a 'healthier' alternative to alcohol.
Ergine, isoergine	Rivea corymbosa	Seeds contain ergine, isoergine, lysergol, and turbicoryn. lysergic acid alkaloids up to 0.03%. Has psychedelic properties.
Salvinorin A	Salvia divinorum	Salvinorin A in 0.89–3.87 mg/g. Also, Salvinorin B and Salvinorin C.
Mesembrine	Sceletium tortuosum	Kanna.
Baicalein	Scutellaria	Known commonly as 'skullcaps'. Baicalein is a positive allosteric modulator of GABA_{A} receptor.
Unknown	Sessea	S. brasiliensis poisoning is described as very similar to that of Cestrum laevigatum: a species used to induce hallucinations by the Krahô tribe for spiritual purposes.
Unknown	Silene capensis	Produces vivid dreams after smoking.
Unknown	Tagetes lucida	Anethole, Chavicol, Coumarin, Estragole, Isorhamnetin, Methyleugenol, and Quercitin.
Ibogaine	Tabernanthe iboga	Ibogaine in root bark. Produces psychedelic and dissociative effects.
Ibogaine	Tabernanthe orientalis	Ibogaine in root leaves. Produces psychedelic and dissociative effects.
Voacangine, Ibogaine	Tabernaemontana divaricata	Is a psychedelic and a dissociative.
Ibogaine	Tabernanthe pubescens	Is a psychedelic and a dissociative. Contains ibogaine and similar alkaloids.
Ibogaine	Tabernaemontana sp.	Is a psychedelic and a dissociative.
Theobromine	Theobroma cacao	Cocoa or cacao bean used in chocolate. native to the Americas
Ibogaine	Trachelospermum jasminoides	Exhibits psychedelic and dissociative effects. Contains ibogaine, coronaridine, voacangine, apparicine, conoflorine, and 19-epi-voacangarine.
Valerenic acid	Valeriana officinalis	Possible sedative and anxiolytic effects. Valerenic acid is GABA_{A} receptor positive allosteric modulator, and a 5-HT_{5A} receptor partial agonist.
Vincamine	Vinca minor	Vincamine.
Voacangine	Voacanga africana	Voacangine is similar in structure to ibogaine. It inhibits AChE.
Dendrobine	Dendrobium nobile	Also contains phenanthrenes and dendrobine related alkaloids.
Possibly Genistein and Apigenin	Zornia latifolia	Zornia latifolia is sometimes combined with synthetic cannabis. It may produce similar effects to cannabis. It is nicknamed Maconha brava because locals use it as a cannabis substitute.

== See also ==
- Aztec entheogenic complex
- Entheogenic drugs and the archaeological record
- God in a Pill?
- Hallucinogenic fish
- Hallucinogenic plants in Chinese herbals
- List of Acacia species known to contain psychoactive alkaloids
- List of entheogenic/hallucinogenic species
- List of plants used for smoking
- List of poisonous plants
- List of psychoactive drugs
- List of psychoactive plants, fungi, and animals
- Louisiana State Act 159
- Dimethyltryptamine
- Psilocybin mushrooms
- Psychoactive cactus
- Psychoactive plant
- The Encyclopedia of Psychoactive Plants
- Pharmacotheon (1993/1996)

== Bibliography ==
- Al Zarouni, Yousif (2015). The Effects of Khat (Catha Edulis). London: Yousif Al Zarouni.
