= Virola calophylla =

Conservation status
- Least Concern (IUCN 3.1)

Scientific classification
- Kingdom: Plantae
- Clade: Embryophytes
- Clade: Tracheophytes
- Clade: Spermatophytes
- Clade: Angiosperms
- Clade: Magnoliids
- Order: Magnoliales
- Family: Myristicaceae
- Genus: Virola
- Species: V. calophylla

Binomial name
- Virola calophylla (Spruce) Warb.

Synonyms
- Myristica calophylla Spruce; Otoba incolor H.Karst.; Palala calophylla (Spruce) Kuntze; Virola incolor Warb.; Virola lepidota A.C.Sm.

Species of tree

Virola calophylla is a species of tree in the family Myristicaceae. It is native to South America, namely Guyana, Suriname, northern and west-central Brazil, Bolivia, Colombia (Department of Amazonas, Department of Vaupés), Ecuador (Napo, Pastaza, Sucumbios) and Peru (Amazonas Region, Loreto Region, Madre de Dios Region, Puno Region, Ucayali Region).

The tree grows 5 to 25 metres (16 to 82 ft) tall and it is found in low elevation evergreen forests. The fruit is ellipsoid to ovoid and subglobular, 19 to 32 millimetres (0.75 to 1.26 in) long and 12 to 20 millimetres (0.47 to 0.79 in) in diameter in groups of 1 to 32.

Virola calophylla contains dimethyltryptamine and other tryptamines, and in the Orinoco River region, the Witoto and Bora use it as a snuff.

== See also ==
- List of psychoactive plants
