= Leptactina papyrophloea =

Conservation status
- Endangered (IUCN 3.1)

Scientific classification
- Kingdom: Plantae
- Clade: Tracheophytes
- Clade: Angiosperms
- Clade: Eudicots
- Clade: Asterids
- Order: Gentianales
- Family: Rubiaceae
- Genus: Leptactina
- Species: L. papyrophloea

Binomial name
- Leptactina papyrophloea Verdc.

Species of plant

Leptactina papyrophloea is a species of flowering plant in the family Rubiaceae. It is a tree endemic to southeastern Tanzania. It is threatened by habitat loss.
