= Leptactina papalis =

Scientific classification
- Kingdom: Plantae
- Clade: Tracheophytes
- Clade: Angiosperms
- Clade: Eudicots
- Clade: Asterids
- Order: Gentianales
- Family: Rubiaceae
- Genus: Leptactina
- Species: L. papalis

Binomial name
- Leptactina papalis (N.Hallé) De Block (2015)

Synonyms
- Coleactina papalis N.Hallé (1970)

Species of flowering plant

Leptactina papalis is a species of flowering plant in the family Rubiaceae. It is a tree is native to Republic of the Congo and Gabon.

It was first described as Coleactina papalis in 1970, and placed in the monotypic genus Coleactina. It was reclassified into genus Leptactina in 2015.
