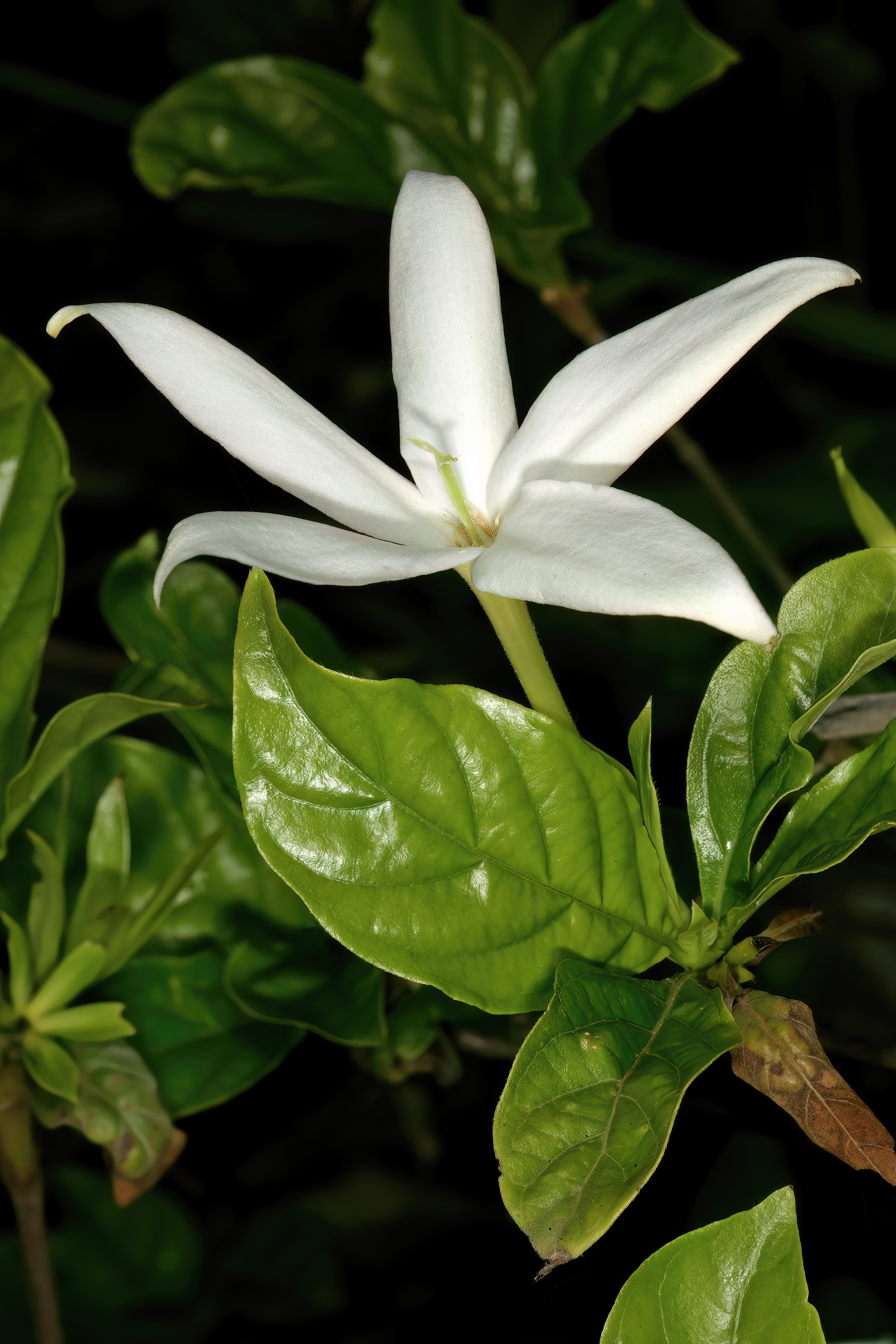
- Leptactina delagoensis subsp. delagoensis

Scientific classification
- Kingdom: Plantae
- Clade: Tracheophytes
- Clade: Angiosperms
- Clade: Eudicots
- Clade: Asterids
- Order: Gentianales
- Family: Rubiaceae
- Subfamily: Ixoroideae
- Tribe: Pavetteae
- Genus: Leptactina; Hook.f. (1871)

Species
- 27; see text

Synonyms
- Coleactina N.Hallé (1970); Dictyandra Welw. ex Hook.f. (1873)

= Leptactina =

Genus of plants

Leptactina is a genus of flowering plants in the family Rubiaceae. There are about 27 species. They are all native to sub-Saharan Africa, where most occur in rainforest habitat.

27 species are accepted:

- Leptactina angolensis (Hutch.) Bullock ex I.Nogueira
- Leptactina arborescens (Welw. ex Benth. & Hook.f.) De Block
- Leptactina benguelensis (Welw. ex Benth. & Hook.f.) R.D.Good
- Leptactina congolana (Robbr.) De Block
- Leptactina deblockiae Neuba & Sonké
- Leptactina delagoensis K.Schum.
- Leptactina densiflora Hook.f.
- Leptactina epinyctios Bullock ex Verdc.
- Leptactina euclinioides K.Schum.
- Leptactina formosa K.Schum.
- Leptactina gloeocalyx K.Schum.
- Leptactina involucrata Hook.f.
- Leptactina latifolia K.Schum.
- Leptactina laurentiana Dewèvre
- Leptactina liebrechtsiana De Wild. & T.Durand
- Leptactina mannii Hook.f.
- Leptactina oxyloba K.Schum.
- Leptactina papalis (N.Hallé) De Block
- Leptactina papyrophloea Verdc.
- Leptactina platyphylla (Hiern) Wernham
- Leptactina polyneura K.Krause
- Leptactina pretrophylax K.Schum.
- Leptactina prostrata K.Schum.
- Leptactina pynaertii De Wild.
- Leptactina rheophytica Sonké & Neuba
- Leptactina senegambica Hook.f.
- Leptactina tessmannii K.Krause
