= Leptactina densiflora =

Scientific classification
- Kingdom: Plantae
- Clade: Tracheophytes
- Clade: Angiosperms
- Clade: Eudicots
- Clade: Asterids
- Order: Gentianales
- Family: Rubiaceae
- Genus: Leptactina
- Species: L. densiflora

Binomial name
- Leptactina densiflora Hook.f.

Species of plant

Leptactina densiflora, also known as Leptactinia, is a shrub from central Africa, and can grow from 6 to 12 feet. The plant is a psychedelic, containing tetrahydroharmine (also known as leptaflorin) which is a monoamine oxidase inhibitor.
