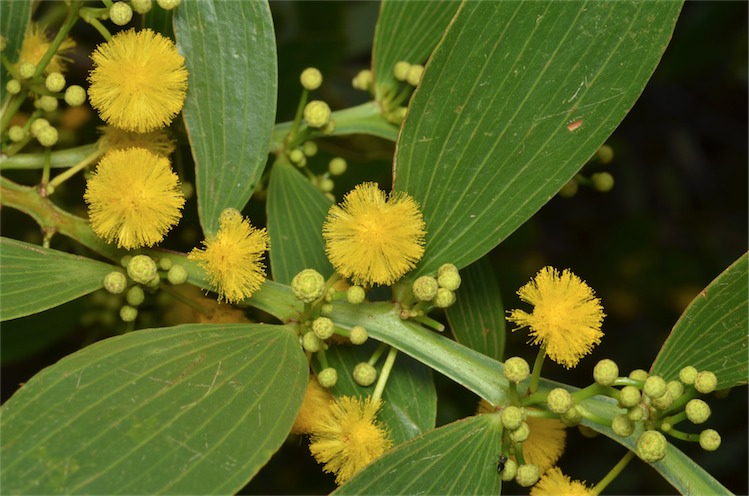
- Near Childers

Scientific classification
- Kingdom: Plantae
- Clade: Tracheophytes
- Clade: Angiosperms
- Clade: Eudicots
- Clade: Rosids
- Order: Fabales
- Family: Fabaceae
- Subfamily: Caesalpinioideae
- Clade: Mimosoid clade
- Genus: Acacia
- Species: A. complanata

Binomial name
- Acacia complanata A.Cunn. ex Benth.
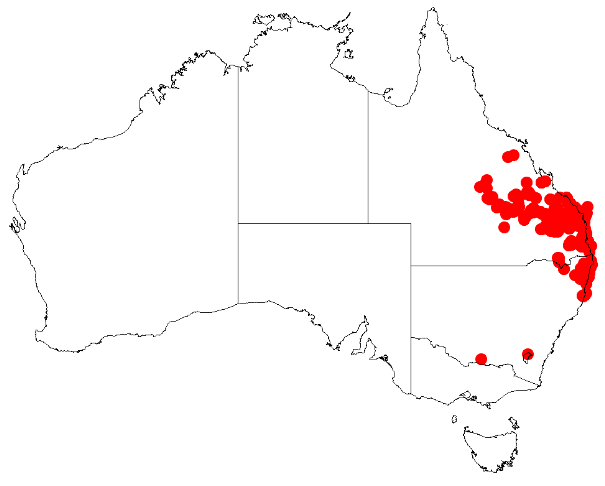
- Occurrence data from AVH

Synonyms
- Acacia anceps Hook. nom. illeg., nom. superfl.; Acacia complanata A.Cunn. ex Benth. var. complanata; Racosperma complanatum (Benth.) Pedley

= Acacia complanata =

Species of legume

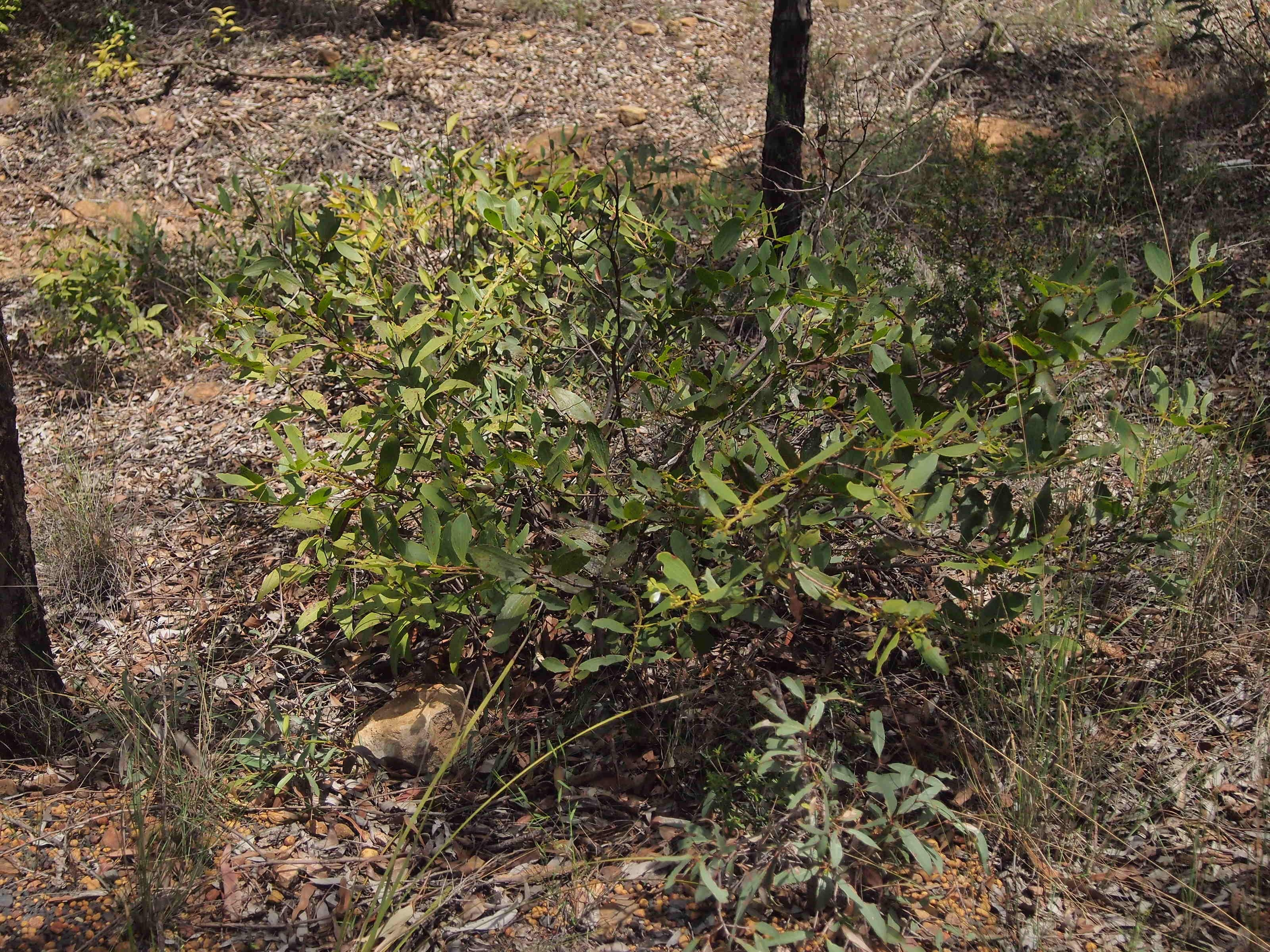
Habit

Acacia complanata, commonly known as flat-stemmed wattle, long-pod wattle or donkey's ears, is a species of flowering plant in the family Fabaceae and is endemic to eastern Australia. It is a shrub or tree with branches arching downwards, narrowly winged branchlets, narrowly linear, thinly leathery phyllodes, spherical heads of bright yellow flowers and linear, thinly leathery to crusty, wrinkled pods.

== Description ==
Acacia complanata is a shrub or tree that typically grows to a height of up to 5–6 m (16–20 ft) and has downwards arching branches. Its branchlets are more or less winding, flattened, narrowly winged and glabrous. The phyllodes are narrowly elliptic, mostly 50–100 mm (2.0–3.9 in) long and 10–30 mm (0.39–1.18 in) wide, thinly leathery and glabrous with 7 to 9 prominent veins. The flowers are borne in 4 to 8 spherical heads in axils on peduncles 8–12 mm (0.31–0.47 in) long. The heads are about 6 mm (0.24 in) in diameter with mostly 35 to 45 bright yellow flowers. Flowering occurs roughly from November to March, and the pods are linear, thinly leathery to crusty, glabrous, up to 150 mm (5.9 in) long, 6–10 mm (0.24–0.39 in) wide and rounded over the seeds. The seeds are more or less spherical, dull, dark brown and 4–5 mm (0.16–0.20 in) long.

== Taxonomy ==
Acacia complanata was first formally described in 1842 by the George Bentham from an unpublished description by Allan Cunningham, and the description was published in William Jackson Hooker's London Journal of Botany. The specific epithet is taken from the Latin word complanatus meaning 'flattened out' in reference to the shape of the stems.

== Distribution and habitat ==
Flat-stemmed wattle is widely distributed throughout south-eastern Queensland from around Jericho in the west to around Bundaberg in the east and is also found as far southwest as the Dumaresq River in New South Wales and down the north coast to around Coffs Harbour, New South Wales. It is grows on low ridges in gravelly, sandy to loamy soils, often over sandstone, and usually in heathland or dry sclerophyll forest. It also occurs in a disjunct population near Torrington.

== Use in horticulture ==
This species of wattle is an ideal suburban garden species, rewarding the gardener with flowers several times a year. It can be pruned to a desired shape and recovers from fire from a lignotuber. It is easily propagated from seed, following treatment by soaking in boiling water or by scarification.

== See also ==
- List of Acacia species
