= Virola rufula =

Scientific classification
- Kingdom: Plantae
- Clade: Tracheophytes
- Clade: Angiosperms
- Clade: Magnoliids
- Order: Magnoliales
- Family: Myristicaceae
- Genus: Virola
- Species: V. rufula

Binomial name
- Virola rufula Warb.

Species of tree

Virola rufula is a species of tree in the family Myristicaceae.

The tree contains alkaloids in its bark, leaves and roots. methoxy-dimethyltryptamine makes up 95% of the alkaloids. There is about 0.190% 5-MeO-DMT in bark, 0.135% 5-MeO-DMT in root, and 0.092% dimethyltryptamine in the leaves.
