= Virola cuspidata =

Scientific classification
- Kingdom: Plantae
- Clade: Tracheophytes
- Clade: Angiosperms
- Clade: Magnoliids
- Order: Magnoliales
- Family: Myristicaceae
- Genus: Virola
- Species: V. cuspidata

Binomial name
- Virola cuspidata (Benth.) Warb.

Synonyms
- Myristica cuspidata Benth.; Palala cuspidata (Benth.) Kuntze; Myristica cuspidata var. globifera Spruce ex A.DC.; Myristica cuspidata var. rufula A.DC.; Myristica longicuspis Spreng. ex Warb.; Myristica membranacea Poepp. ex A.DC.; Myristica punctata Spruce ex Benth.; Myristica uapensis Spruce ex A.DC.; Palala membranacea (Poepp. ex A.DC.) Kuntze; Palala punctata (Spruce ex Benth.) Kuntze; Palala uapensis (Spruce ex A.DC.) Kuntze; Virola cuspidata var. membranacea (Poepp. ex A.DC.) Warb.; Virola elongata var. longicuspis Warb.; Virola elongata var. punctata (Spruce ex Benth.) Warb.; Virola elongata var. subcordata Warb.

Species of tree

Virola cuspidata is a species of plant in the family Myristicaceae. It is native to South America, occurring in Bolivia, Brazil, Colombia, Ecuador, Guyana, Peru, and Venezuela. It is a shrub or slender tree growing to 10 m (33 ft) tall.
