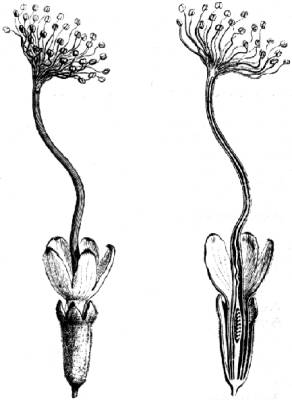
- Acacia sassa Blossom

Scientific classification
- Kingdom: Plantae
- Clade: Embryophytes
- Clade: Tracheophytes
- Clade: Spermatophytes
- Clade: Angiosperms
- Clade: Eudicots
- Clade: Rosids
- Order: Fabales
- Family: Fabaceae
- Subfamily: Caesalpinioideae
- Clade: Mimosoid clade
- Genus: Acacia
- Species: A. sassa

Binomial name
- Acacia sassa (Willd.) Baillon ex Drake

= Acacia sassa =

Species of legume

Acacia sassa is a legume that grows in the forests of Senegal. Carl Ludwig von Willdenow first described it. Smoke from certain parts of it is known to be psychoactive.
