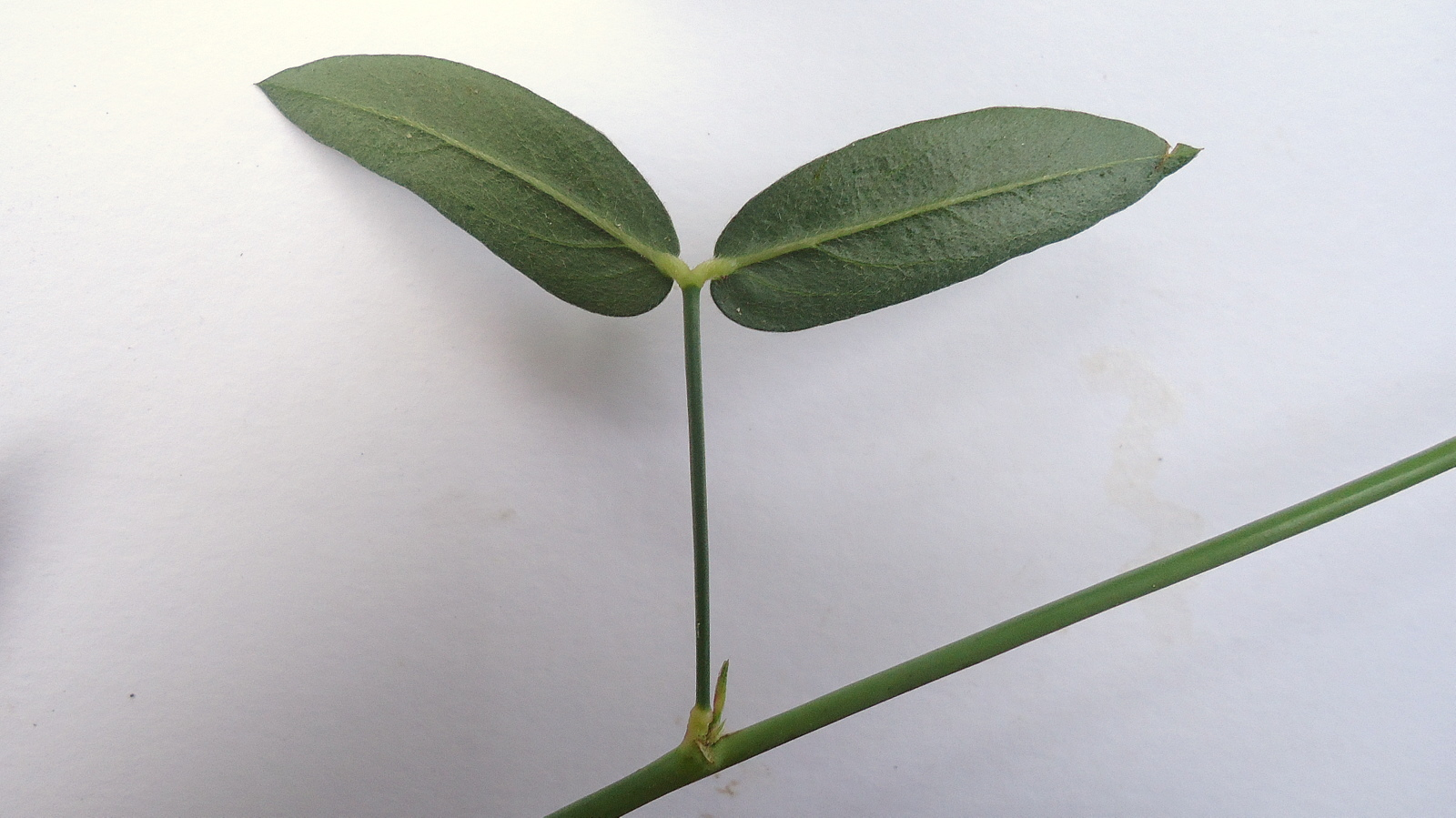

Scientific classification
- Kingdom: Plantae
- Clade: Tracheophytes
- Clade: Angiosperms
- Clade: Eudicots
- Clade: Rosids
- Order: Fabales
- Family: Fabaceae
- Subfamily: Faboideae
- Genus: Zornia
- Species: Z. latifolia

Binomial name
- Zornia latifolia Sm.

Synonyms
- Zornia gracilis; Zornia pubescens; Zornia surinamensis

= Zornia latifolia =

Species of legume

Zornia latifolia is a species of flowering plant in the legume family, Fabaceae. It is native to South America. Its distribution may extend into Central and North America. It is also known as a naturalized species in tropical western Africa. The plant is known commonly as maconha brava.

== Description ==
This plant is a perennial herb with a branching stem taking a prostrate form on the ground and growing up to about 50 centimeters long. The leaves are bifoliolate, each made up of two leaflets, which are widely lance-shaped and up to 4 centimeters long. At the base is a stipule up to a centimeter in length. The herbage is hairless to lightly hairy. The inflorescence is a spike of up to 35 yellow flowers each about a centimeter long. The flowers open for only 5 to 10 hours. The bractlets are longer than the flowers and may cover them. The fruit is a spiny, hairy legume pod.

== Ecology ==
In its native range it grows in savanna habitat with acidic and low-fertility soils. It tolerates drought, but does not tolerate cold or shade. In Africa it grows as a weed in lawns and on roadsides.

The plant is susceptible to plant pathogens such as the fungi Sphaceloma zorniae, which causes scab disease, and Meliola species, which cause stunting and distortion of the leaves. Insect pests include the red-necked peanutworm moth (Stegasta bosqueella).

== Uses ==
=== Forage ===
This legume is a nutritious and palatable forage for livestock. It can be grown as a companion plant to grasses such as Andropogon gayanus and Brachiaria decumbens.

=== Hallucinogen and adulteration ===
A common component of many synthetic cannabis mixtures producing hallucinogenic effects, such as the street drug, 'Spice', though these mixtures effects are caused by synthetic cannaboids, Zornia latifolia may have cannabis-like effects. It may be adulterated by a different Fabaceae plant, Stylosanthes guianensis, which is phytochemically different from Zornia latifolia. The flavones genistein, apigenin and syzalterin may explain the cannabis-like effects of Zornia latifolia.
