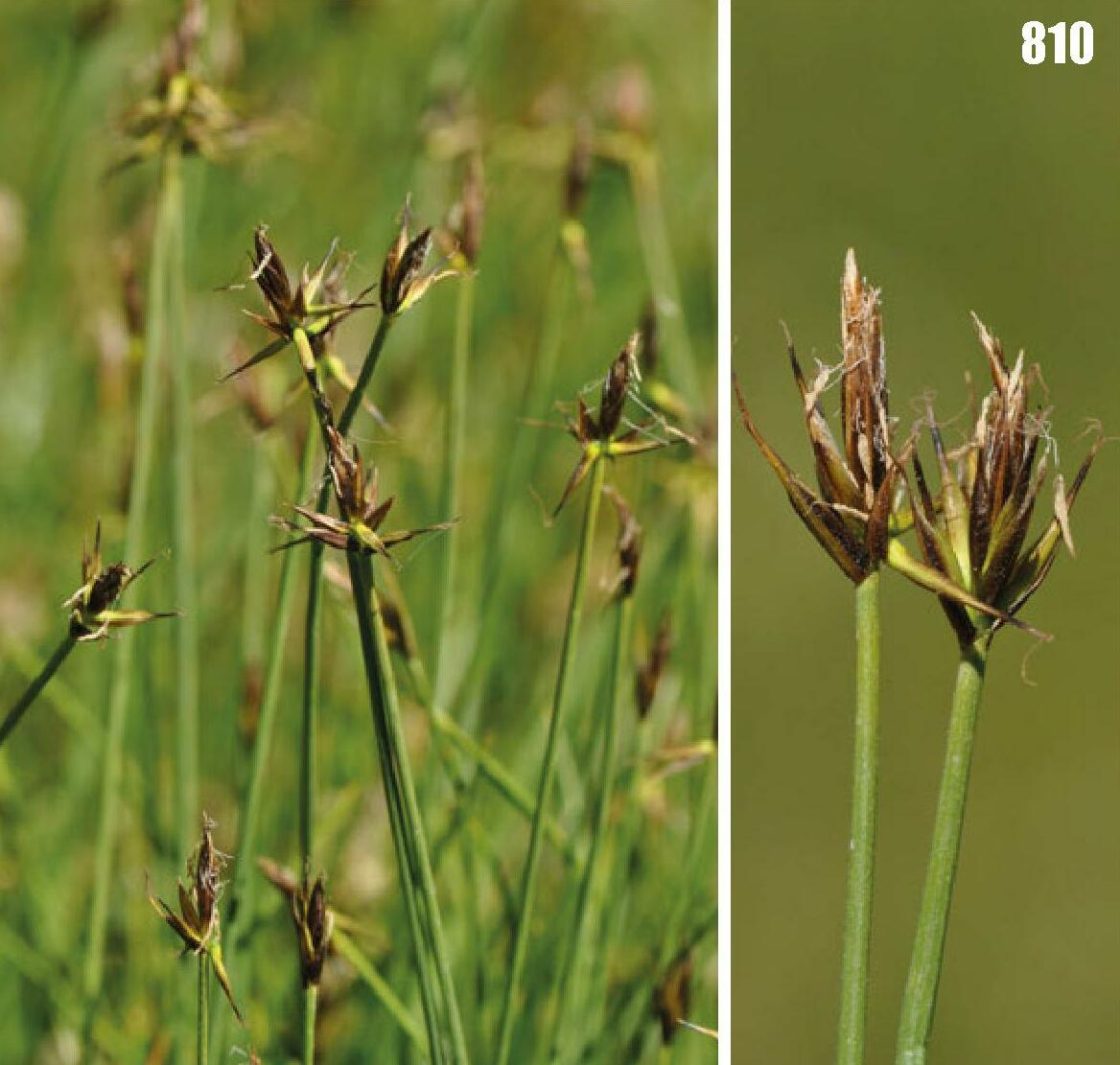

Scientific classification
- Kingdom: Plantae
- Clade: Tracheophytes
- Clade: Angiosperms
- Clade: Monocots
- Clade: Commelinids
- Order: Poales
- Family: Cyperaceae
- Genus: Carex
- Species: C. parva

Binomial name
- Carex parva Nees

= Carex parva =

Species of sedge

Carex parva, also known to Chinese people as xiao tai cao, is a tussock-forming species of perennial sedge in the family Cyperaceae. It is native to parts of Asia from Afghanistan to Mongolia.

The sedge has a loosely-tufted habit and has thick horizontal rhizome that can be up to 20 cm (7.9 in) in length and covered in scales that disintegrate in time. The soft, smooth and sometimes flattened culms reach a height of 10 to 35 cm (3.9 to 13.8 in) and have brown coloured basal sheaths.

The species was described by the botanist Christian Gottfried Daniel Nees von Esenbeck in 1834 as published in Contributions to the Botany of India. The type specimen was collected in a boggy meadow in the Kishenganga Valley leading to Nanga Parbat in Kashmir. There are three synonyms; Carex macrorhyncha, Carex unifoliata and Kobresia lolonum.

The range of the plant extends from Kazakhstan, Uzbekistan and Turkmenistan in the west to the coast of China in the east. It is found from Kazakhstan and Mongolia in the north to Pakistan in the south. It is found throughout the Himalayas.

== See also ==
- List of Carex species
