= 1-Acetyl-5-MeO-DMT =

Clinical data
- Other names: "Methyl amide 5-MeO-DMT"; 1-Acetyl-5-methoxy-N,N-dimethyltryptamine; 1A-5-MeO-DMT; 1-Ac-5-MeO-DMT; "Example 2-16"
- Drug class: Serotonergic psychedelic; Hallucinogen
- ATC code: None

Identifiers
- IUPAC name: 1-[3-[2-(dimethylamino)ethyl]-5-methoxyindol-1-yl]ethanone
- CAS Number: 39998-63-5
- PubChem CID: 85809049
- ChemSpider: 129443806
- ChEMBL: ChEMBL5266842

Chemical and physical data
- Formula: C_{15}H_{20}N_{2}O_{2}
- Molar mass: 260.337 g·mol^{−1}
- 3D model (JSmol): Interactive image
- SMILES: CC(=O)N1C=C(C2=C1C=CC(=C2)OC)CCN(C)C
- InChI: InChI=1S/C15H20N2O2/c1-11(18)17-10-12(7-8-16(2)3)14-9-13(19-4)5-6-15(14)17/h5-6,9-10H,7-8H2,1-4H3; Key:FALARLKUFDIOTH-UHFFFAOYSA-N

1-Acetyl-5-MeO-DMT, also known as "methyl amide 5-MeO-DMT" or as 1-acetyl-5-methoxy-N,N-dimethyltryptamine, is a psychedelic drug of the tryptamine and 5-methoxytryptamine families related to 5-MeO-DMT. It is the 1-acetyl derivative of 5-MeO-DMT. The drug is a prodrug of 5-MeO-DMT with modified pharmacokinetic properties compared to 5-MeO-DMT in rodents. It is assumed to be cleaved into 5-MeO-DMT by amidase enzymes. Various analogues of 1-acetyl-5-MeO-DMT that are likewise 5-MeO-DMT or dimethyltryptamine (DMT) prodrugs have also been described and have shown widely varying pharmacokinetic parameters, for instance half-life. 1-Acetyl-5-MeO-DMT was first described in the literature in a patent by Terran Biosciences in 2023. It has been one of the major prodrug compounds highlighted from the patent.

== See also ==
- Substituted tryptamine
- 1-Benzoyl-DMT (1-Bz-DMT)
- NBoc-DMT (N′-tert-butoxycarbonyl-DMT)
- N-Phosphonooxymethyl-DMT (N-POM-DMT)
- ALD-52 (1-acetyl-LSD; 1A-LSD)
