= N-Phosphonooxymethyl-DMT =

Clinical data
- Other names: VLS-02-23-10; N-POM-DMT; N-Phosphonooxymethyl-N,N-dimethyltryptamine
- Drug class: Serotonergic psychedelic; Hallucinogen
- ATC code: None

Identifiers
- IUPAC name: [2-(1H-indol-3-yl)ethyl-dimethylazaniumyl]methyl hydrogen phosphate
- PubChem CID: 167345639

Chemical and physical data
- Formula: C_{13}H_{19}N_{2}O_{4}P
- Molar mass: 298.279 g·mol^{−1}
- 3D model (JSmol): Interactive image
- SMILES: C[N+](C)(CCC1=CNC2=CC=CC=C21)COP(=O)(O)[O-]
- InChI: InChI=1S/C13H19N2O4P/c1-15(2,10-19-20(16,17)18)8-7-11-9-14-13-6-4-3-5-12(11)13/h3-6,9,14H,7-8,10H2,1-2H3,(H-,16,17,18); Key:RFEMNANKBGCRLY-UHFFFAOYSA-N

N-Phosphonooxymethyl-DMT, or N-POM-DMT, also known as VLS-02-23-10, is a psychedelic drug of the tryptamine family related to dimethyltryptamine (DMT). It is the N-phosphonooxymethyl derivative of DMT. The drug is a prodrug of DMT with modified pharmacokinetic properties compared to DMT in rodents. The chemical synthesis of N-phosphonooxymethyl-DMT has been described. Various analogues of N-phosphonooxymethyl-DMT have also been described. One of these is N-phosphonooxymethyl-5-MeO-DMT (N-POM-5-MeO-DMT), which is a putative prodrug of 5-MeO-DMT. N-Phosphonooxymethyl-DMT was patented by Tanweer A. Khan and colleagues in affiliation with Atai Therapeutics in 2024.

== See also ==
- Substituted tryptamine
- N-(2-Cyanoethyl)tryptamine (CE-T)
- 1-Benzoyl-DMT (1Bz-DMT)
- 1-Acetyl-5-MeO-DMT (1A-5-MeO-DMT)
- NBoc-DMT (N′-tert-butoxycarbonyl-DMT)
