= C20H30N2O3 =

The molecular formula C_{20}H_{30}N_{2}O_{3} may refer to:

- DEMPDHPCA-2C-D
- Morpheridine
- NB-5-MeO-MiPT
