= Virola pavonis =

Conservation status
- Least Concern (IUCN 3.1)

Scientific classification
- Kingdom: Plantae
- Clade: Tracheophytes
- Clade: Angiosperms
- Clade: Magnoliids
- Order: Magnoliales
- Family: Myristicaceae
- Genus: Virola
- Species: V. pavonis

Binomial name
- Virola pavonis (A.DC.) A.C.Sm. (1938)

Synonyms
- Myristica pavonis A.DC. (1857); Myristica venosa var. pavonis (A.DC.) Warb.; Palala pavonis (A.DC.) Kuntze; Virola elliptica A.C.Sm.; Virola venosa var. pavonis (A.DC.) Warb.

Species of tree

Virola pavonis is a species of tree in the family Myristicaceae. It is found in Brazil (Acre, Amazonas, Mato Grosso, Pará, Rondônia), Bolivia, Colombia, Ecuador, Peru and Venezuela. The tree grows to a height of about 15-30m tall.

== Appearance ==
=== Fruit and flowers ===
The Virola pavonis tree bears an ellipsoidal fruit, 36–42 mm long and 30–34 mm in diameter. The fruit appears to be nut like, with an outer shell with a reddish colored fruit inside. Before the fruit gets to this stage, it is a green unripe nut like in appearance. The Virola pavonis also is a flowering tree, having small reddish yellow flowering bud.

=== Leaves ===
The leaves of the Virola pavonis tree are in an alternate pattern, meaning the leaves spring one node at different levels of the stem. The veins of the leaf are pinnate. There is one main stem or midrib from which the other stems source from. The leaf is elliptically shaped with smooth margins (or edges). Also, the leaves of Virola pavonis are stalked meaning the leaves have a petiole thus meaning it is petiolated.

== Occurrences ==
Virola pavonis has the highest concentration as well as the most commonly recorded to be found in various areas of Peru as well as in the Amazon.

== Chemical components ==
Virola pavonis bears a fruit. The seeds of this fruit contain various neolignans. According to an abstract written by Marcia O.M. Marquesa, Massayoshi Yoshidaa and Otto R. Gottlieba for the Instituto de Química, Universidade de São Paul in March 1992,

"Virola pavonis was found to contain in the arils of its fruits 8.O.4′,7.O.3′-neolignans (eusiderins A, C and K) and a 8.O.4′-neolignan (of the β-propenylaryloxy-arylpropane type) and in the seed coats of its fruits 8.5′-neolignans (carinatone, carinatol) and 8.5′,7.O.4′-neolignans (dihydrocarinatin, carinatin). Some previous 13C NMR assignments for the latter four compounds are corrected."

The leaves of Virola pavonis contain the chemical compounds DMT and pavonisol, according to Pedro H Ferria and Lauro E.S Barataa;

"Pavonisol, a new C-1/C-2 oxygenated phenylpropanoid, together with the known eusiderin-E and an 8,4′-oxyneolignan, were isolated from Virola pavonis leaves. Their structures were established by spectroscopic methods and chemical transformations."

== See also ==
- Psychedelic plants
