= 1-Benzoyl-DMT =

Clinical data
- Other names: "DMT benzamide"; "Dimethyltryptamine benzamide"; 1-Benzoyl-N,N-dimethyltryptamine; 1Bz-DMT; "Example 2-17"
- Drug class: Serotonergic psychedelic; Hallucinogen
- ATC code: None

Identifiers
- IUPAC name: [3-[2-(dimethylamino)ethyl]indol-1-yl]-phenylmethanone
- CAS Number: 481661-45-4
- PubChem CID: 166467678

Chemical and physical data
- Formula: C_{19}H_{20}N_{2}O
- Molar mass: 292.382 g·mol^{−1}
- 3D model (JSmol): Interactive image
- SMILES: CN(C)CCC1=CN(C2=CC=CC=C21)C(=O)C3=CC=CC=C3
- InChI: InChI=1S/C19H20N2O/c1-20(2)13-12-16-14-21(18-11-7-6-10-17(16)18)19(22)15-8-4-3-5-9-15/h3-11,14H,12-13H2,1-2H3; Key:JWUSHQNZPBFVEL-UHFFFAOYSA-N

1-Benzoyl-DMT, also known as "DMT benzamide" or as 1-benzoyl-N,N-dimethyltryptamine, is a psychedelic drug of the tryptamine family related to dimethyltryptamine (DMT). It is the 1-benzoyl derivative of DMT. The drug is a prodrug of DMT with modified pharmacokinetic properties compared to DMT in rodents. It is assumed to be cleaved into DMT by amidase enzymes. Various analogues of 1-benzoyl-DMT that are likewise DMT or 5-MeO-DMT prodrugs have also been described and have shown widely varying pharmacokinetic parameters, for instance half-life. 1-Benzoyl-DMT was first described in the literature in a patent by Terran Biosciences in 2023. It has been one of the major prodrug compounds highlighted from the patent.

== See also ==
- Substituted tryptamine
- NBoc-DMT (N′-tert-butoxycarbonyl-DMT)
- 1-Acetyl-5-MeO-DMT (1A-5-MeO-DMT)
- N-Phosphonooxymethyl-DMT (N-POM-DMT)
- 1Bz-LSD (1-benzoyl-LSD)
