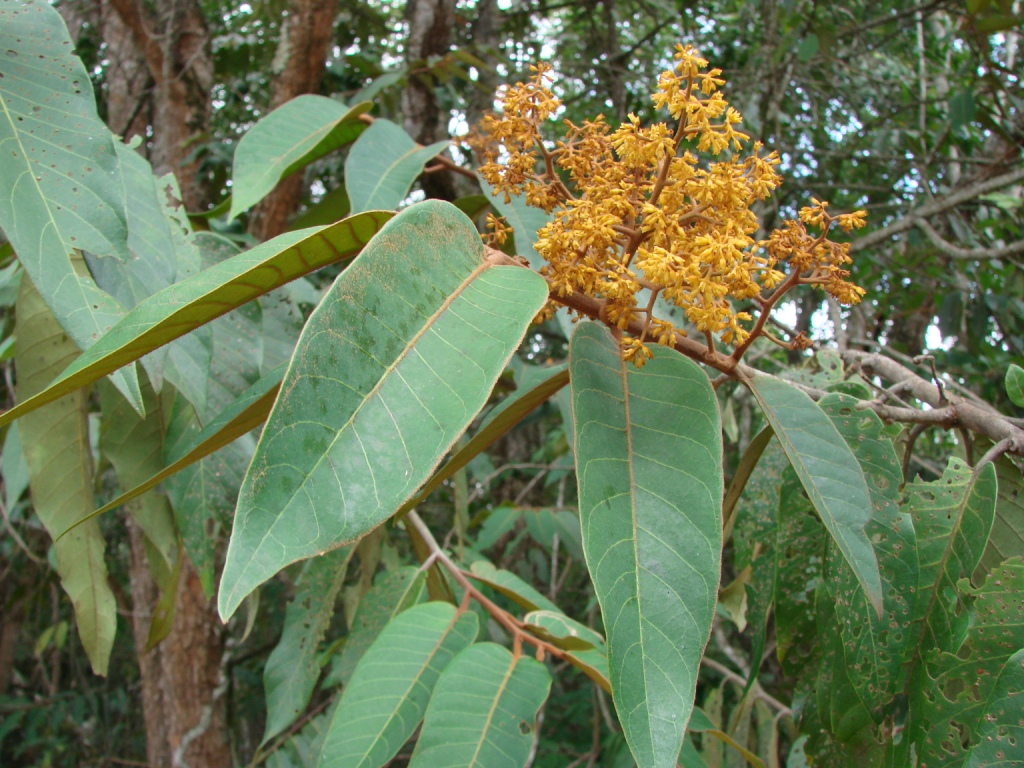

Conservation status
- Least Concern (IUCN 3.1)

Scientific classification
- Kingdom: Plantae
- Clade: Tracheophytes
- Clade: Angiosperms
- Clade: Magnoliids
- Order: Magnoliales
- Family: Myristicaceae
- Genus: Virola
- Species: V. sebifera

Binomial name
- Virola sebifera Aubl.

Synonyms
- Synonymy: Knema sebifera (Aubl.) Peterm.; Myristica cordifolia Mart. ex A.DC.; Myristica mocoa Poepp. ex A.DC.; Myristica panamensis Hemsl.; Myristica sebifera (Aubl.) Sw.; Myristica sebifera var. cordifolia A.DC.; Myristica sebifera var. curvinervia A.DC.; Myristica virola Raeusch.; Palala mocoa (Poepp. ex A.DC.) Kuntze; Palala panamensis (Hemsl.) Kuntze; Palala sebifera (Aubl.) Kuntze; Virola boliviensis Warb.; Virola mocoa (Poepp. ex A.DC.) Warb.; Virola mycetis Pulle; Virola panamensis (Hemsl.) Warb.; Virola peruviana var. tomentosa Warb.; Virola sebifera var. curvinervia Warb.; Virola venezuelensis Warb.; Virola warburgii Pittier

= Virola sebifera =

Species of tree in the nutmeg family

Virola sebifera is a species of tree in the family Myristicaceae, from North and South America.

== Description ==
V. sebifera is a tall, thin tree which grows 5–30 m (16–98 ft) tall. The leaves are simple and grow up to 30 cm (12 in) long. The small flowers are single-sexed and are found in panicles. The fruit is reddish, oval-shaped, and about 10–15 mm (0.39–0.59 in) long and about 11 mm (0.43 in) in diameter. The individual Virola trees, which include 40 to 60 species, are difficult to differentiate from one another.

== Vernacular names ==
English: red ucuuba.

Portuguese: Ucuúba-do-cerrado.

== Chemical constituents ==
The bark of the tree is rich in tannins and also the hallucinogen dimethyltryptamine (DMT), as well as 5-MeO-DMT. The ripe seeds contain fatty acid glycerides, especially laurodimyristin and trimyristin. The bark contains 0.065% to 0.25% alkaloids, most of which are DMT and 5-MeO-DMT. The "juice or gum" of the bark seems to have the highest concentrations of alkaloids (up to 8%).

== Uses ==
=== Industrial uses ===
Seeds from V. sebifera are processed to obtain the fats, which are yellow and aromatic. They smell like nutmeg. The fats also become rancid quickly. They are used industrially in the production of fats, candles, and soaps. This virola fat possesses properties similar to cocoa butter and shea butter.

The wood of V. sebifera has a density around 0.37 g/cm^{3} (0.013 lb/cu in).

=== Homeopathy and traditional uses ===
The smoke of the inner bark of the tree is used by shamans of the indigenous people of Venezuela in cases of fever conditions, or cooked for driving out evil ghosts.

The homeopathic concoction Myristica sebifera (abbreviation: Myris) is derived from the fresh, red juice from the injured bark of the tree. Homeopathic practice uses it for such ailments as abscesses, phlegmon, paronychia, furuncle, anal fissures, infections of the parotid gland, bacterially infected tonsillitis, and others.

As of date, there is no empirical evidence supporting any medical effectiveness of Myristica sebifera. Any physiological efficacy would be highly implausible from a biochemical standpoint.
