= 1Bz-LSD =

Clinical data
- Other names: 1-Benzoyl-LSD; SYN-L-018
- Routes of administration: Oral
- Drug class: Serotonergic psychedelic; Hallucinogen
- ATC code: None

Chemical and physical data
- Formula: C_{27}H_{28}N_{3}O_{2}
- Molar mass: 426.540 g·mol^{−1}
- 3D model (JSmol): Interactive image
- SMILES: CCN(CC)C(=O)[C]1CN(C)[C@@H]2Cc3cn(C(=O)c4ccccc4)c5cccc(C2=C1)c35
- InChI: InChI=1S/C27H28N3O2/c1-4-29(5-2)26(31)20-14-22-21-12-9-13-23-25(21)19(15-24(22)28(3)16-20)17-30(23)27(32)18-10-7-6-8-11-18/h6-14,17,24H,4-5,15-16H2,1-3H3/t24-/m1/s1; Key:GVGINGNTVRBWSQ-XMMPIXPASA-N

1Bz-LSD, also known as 1-benzoyl-LSD or as SYN-L-018, is a psychedelic drug of the lysergamide family related to lysergic acid diethylamide (LSD). It is thought to be a prodrug of LSD. The drug was patented by Lizard Labs in 2024. Subsequently, it was encountered online as a novel designer drug in July 2024. 1Bz-LSD has been sold in the form of blotter tabs and microdots, for instance containing 10 μg and 200 μg doses per unit. A deethylated metabolite, 1Bz-LAE, has been identified. 1Bz-LSD was first described in the scientific literature by 2026. It is not an explicitly controlled substance in the United States or in Canada.

== See also ==
- Substituted lysergamide
- 1SB-LSD
- 1-Benzoyl-DMT
