= 1SB-LSD =

Clinical data
- Other names: 1BS-LSD; 1-TMSBz-LSD; 1-(4-(Trimethylsilyl)benzoyl)-LSD
- Routes of administration: Oral
- Drug class: Serotonergic psychedelic; Hallucinogen
- ATC code: None

Chemical and physical data
- Formula: C_{30}H_{36}N_{3}O_{2}Si
- Molar mass: 498.722 g·mol^{−1}
- 3D model (JSmol): Interactive image
- SMILES: CCN(CC)C(=O)[C]1CN(C)[C@@H]2Cc3cn(C(=O)c4ccc(cc4)[Si](C)(C)C)c5cccc(C2=C1)c35
- InChI: InChI=1S/C30H36N3O2Si/c1-7-32(8-2)29(34)22-16-25-24-10-9-11-26-28(24)21(17-27(25)31(3)18-22)19-33(26)30(35)20-12-14-23(15-13-20)36(4,5)6/h9-16,19,27H,7-8,17-18H2,1-6H3/t27-/m1/s1; Key:SLFZGAWRMZEIEW-HHHXNRCGSA-N

1SB-LSD, or 1BS-LSD, also known as 1-TMSBz-LSD or as 1-(4-(trimethylsilyl)benzoyl)-LSD, is a psychedelic drug of the lysergamide family related to lysergic acid diethylamide (LSD). It is thought to be a prodrug of LSD. The drug was encountered online as a novel designer drug in September 2025. 1SB-LSD has been sold in the form of blotter, for instance containing 165 μg per tab. It is the derivative of 1Bz-LSD (SYN-L-018) in which there is a 4-trimethylsilyl group on the benzyl ring. 1SB-LSD was first described in the scientific literature by 2026. It is not an explicitly controlled substance in the United States or in Canada.

== See also ==
- Substituted lysergamide
