= Virola calophylloidea =

Scientific classification
- Kingdom: Plantae
- Clade: Tracheophytes
- Clade: Angiosperms
- Clade: Magnoliids
- Order: Magnoliales
- Family: Myristicaceae
- Genus: Virola
- Species: V. calophylloidea

Binomial name
- Virola calophylloidea Markgr.

Species of tree

Virola calophylloidea is a species of tree in the family Myristicaceae. It is endemic to Northern Brazil.
