= Virola parvifolia =

Conservation status
- Vulnerable (IUCN 2.3)

Scientific classification
- Kingdom: Plantae
- Clade: Embryophytes
- Clade: Tracheophytes
- Clade: Spermatophytes
- Clade: Angiosperms
- Clade: Magnoliids
- Order: Magnoliales
- Family: Myristicaceae
- Genus: Virola
- Species: V. parvifolia

Binomial name
- Virola parvifolia Ducke

Species of tree

Virola parvifolia is a species of plant in the family Myristicaceae. It is a tree native to northern Brazil, southeastern Colombia, and southern Venezuela.

It is a tree between 4–14 m tall with simple elliptical leaves 5–11 cm long by 3–5 cm wide. The density of its wood is 0.42 g/cm^{3}.
