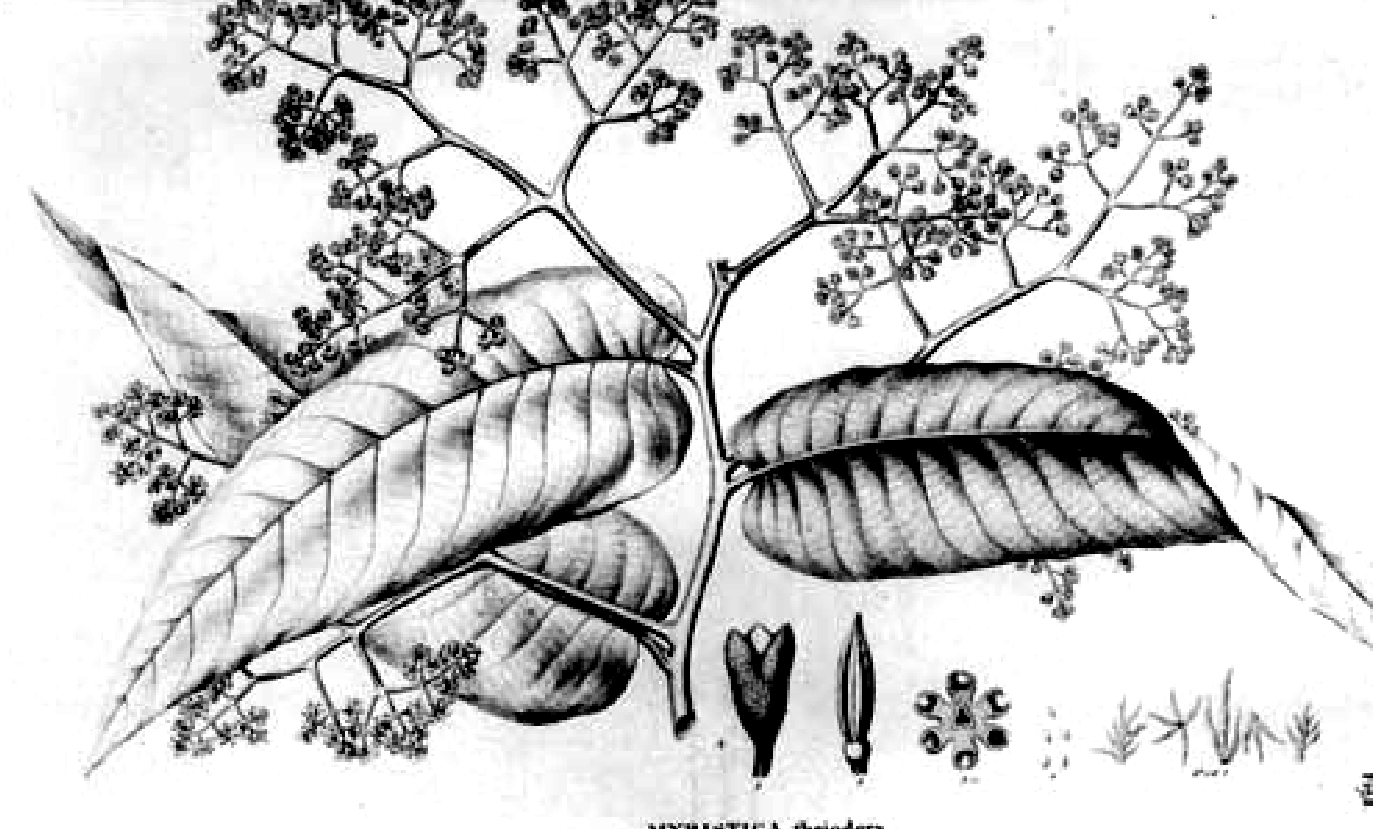
- Virola elongata 1860 Illustration

Conservation status
- Least Concern (IUCN 3.1)

Scientific classification
- Kingdom: Plantae
- Clade: Embryophytes
- Clade: Tracheophytes
- Clade: Spermatophytes
- Clade: Angiosperms
- Clade: Magnoliids
- Order: Magnoliales
- Family: Myristicaceae
- Genus: Virola
- Species: V. elongata

Binomial name
- Virola elongata (Benth.) Warb.

Synonyms
- Myristica elongata Benth. (1853); Palala elongata (Benth.) Kuntze

= Virola elongata =

Species of plant

Virola elongata is a species of tree in the family Myristicaceae. The tree is native to Panama, Guyana, Brazil (Acre, Amazonas, Mato Grosso, Pará, Rondônia and Roraima), Bolivia, Colombia, Ecuador and Peru. It is also found in Suriname. Virola elongata is thin and 7.5–23 m (25–75 ft) tall, sometimes 30 m (98 ft) tall.

The trunk is about 43 cm (17 in) in diameter, cylindrical and has smooth brown and gray bark. The fruit is ellipsoidal to subglobular, 11–20 mm (0.43–0.79 in) long, 10–15 m (33–49 ft) in diameter and comes in groups of 40. The tree is found in evergreen forests and in scrub up to 800 m (2,600 ft) in altitude.

== Fruit and seeds ==
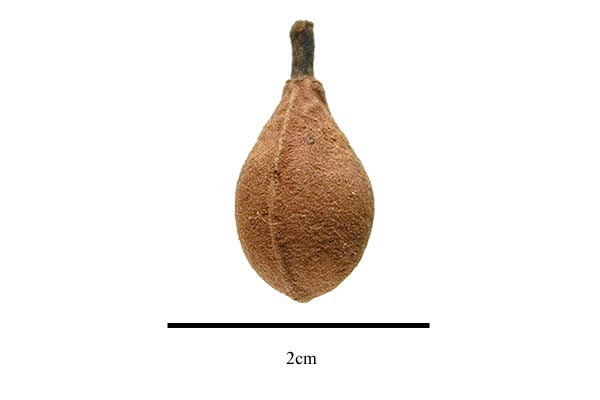
Virola elongata fruit

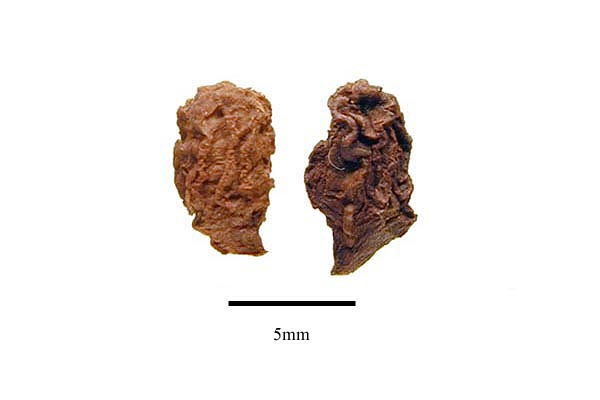
Virola elongata seeds
