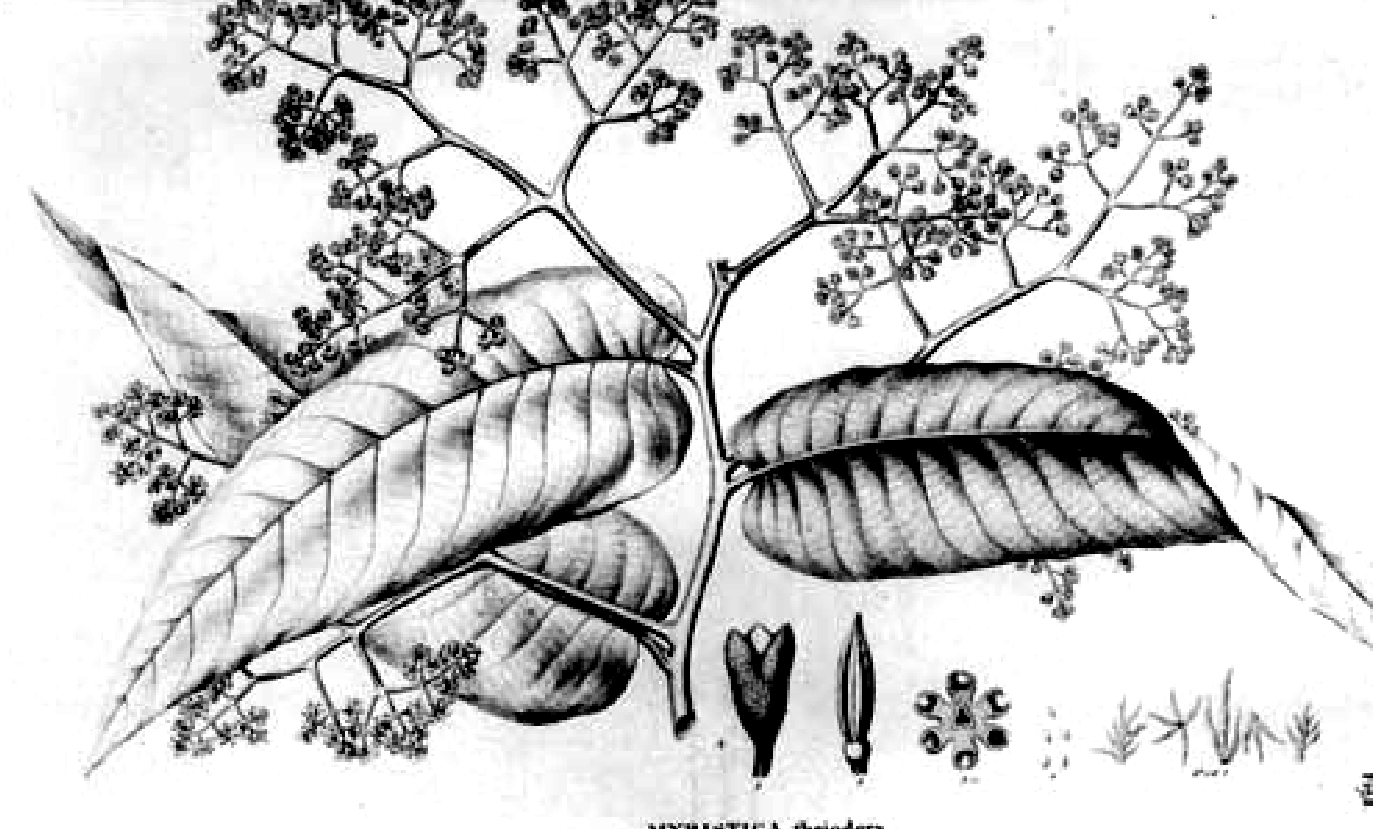

Conservation status
- Least Concern (IUCN 3.1)

Scientific classification
- Kingdom: Plantae
- Clade: Embryophytes
- Clade: Tracheophytes
- Clade: Angiosperms
- Clade: Magnoliids
- Order: Magnoliales
- Family: Myristicaceae
- Genus: Virola
- Species: V. theiodora

Binomial name
- Virola theiodora (Spruce ex Benth.) Warb.

Synonyms
- Myristica rufula Mart. ex A.DC.; Myristica theiodora Spruce ex Benth. (1853); Palala theiodora (Spruce ex Benth.) Kuntze

= Virola theiodora =

Species of flowering plant

Virola theiodora is a species of flowering plant in the family Myristicaceae. It is a tree native to northern Brazil, southeastern Colombia, and Venezuela.

It is used as a medicine and a poison. The Yanomami people use the powdered resin as an entheogen known as nyakwána which is inhaled or "snuffed" into the nasal cavity, it contains a high concentration of 5-MeO-DMT and DMT.

Virola theiodora extracts have weak antibacterial activity against Enterococcus faecalis and Staphylococcus aureus.
