= N-t-BOC-MDMA =

Chemical compound

Clinical data
- Other names: NBoc-MDMA; NB-MDMA; N-tert-Butoxycarbonyl-3,4-methylenedioxymethamphetamine; N-tert-Butoxycarbonyl-MDMA

Identifiers
- IUPAC name: tert-Butyl N-[1-(1,3-benzodioxol-5-yl)propan-2-yl]-N-methylcarbamate
- CAS Number: 1228259-70-8
- PubChem CID: 46237878
- ChemSpider: 68003816
- UNII: DZ4398X4QR

Chemical and physical data
- Formula: C_{16}H_{23}NO_{4}
- Molar mass: 293.363 g·mol^{−1}
- 3D model (JSmol): Interactive image
- SMILES: CC(CC1=CC2=C(C=C1)OCO2)N(C)C(=O)OC(C)(C)C
- InChI: InChI=1S/C16H23NO4/c1-11(17(5)15(18)21-16(2,3)4)8-12-6-7-13-14(9-12)20-10-19-13/h6-7,9,11H,8,10H2,1-5H3; Key:AXMVJRRNQRXHMX-UHFFFAOYSA-N

N-t-BOC-MDMA, also known as N-tert-butoxycarbonyl-MDMA, is a chemical compound which can be both a synthetic precursor to, or a prodrug of the entactogenic drug MDMA ("ecstasy"). It was first identified in Australia in 2015 as a seizure by customs, and has subsequently been found in China, the Netherlands and other European countries. Originally it was thought to be intended as a non-illegal form of MDMA which could be easily converted into the prohibited final product after importation, however one seizure by police found N-t-BOC-MDMA in the process of being pressed into pills, and experiments with simulated gastric fluid confirmed that it can be broken down to MDMA by human stomach acid. Similar N-protected compounds such as N-t-BOC-methamphetamine, N-p-tosyl-methamphetamine, N-t-BOC-ketamine, N-t-BOC-norketamine, and N-methoxycarbonyl-MDA have also been encountered by law enforcement.

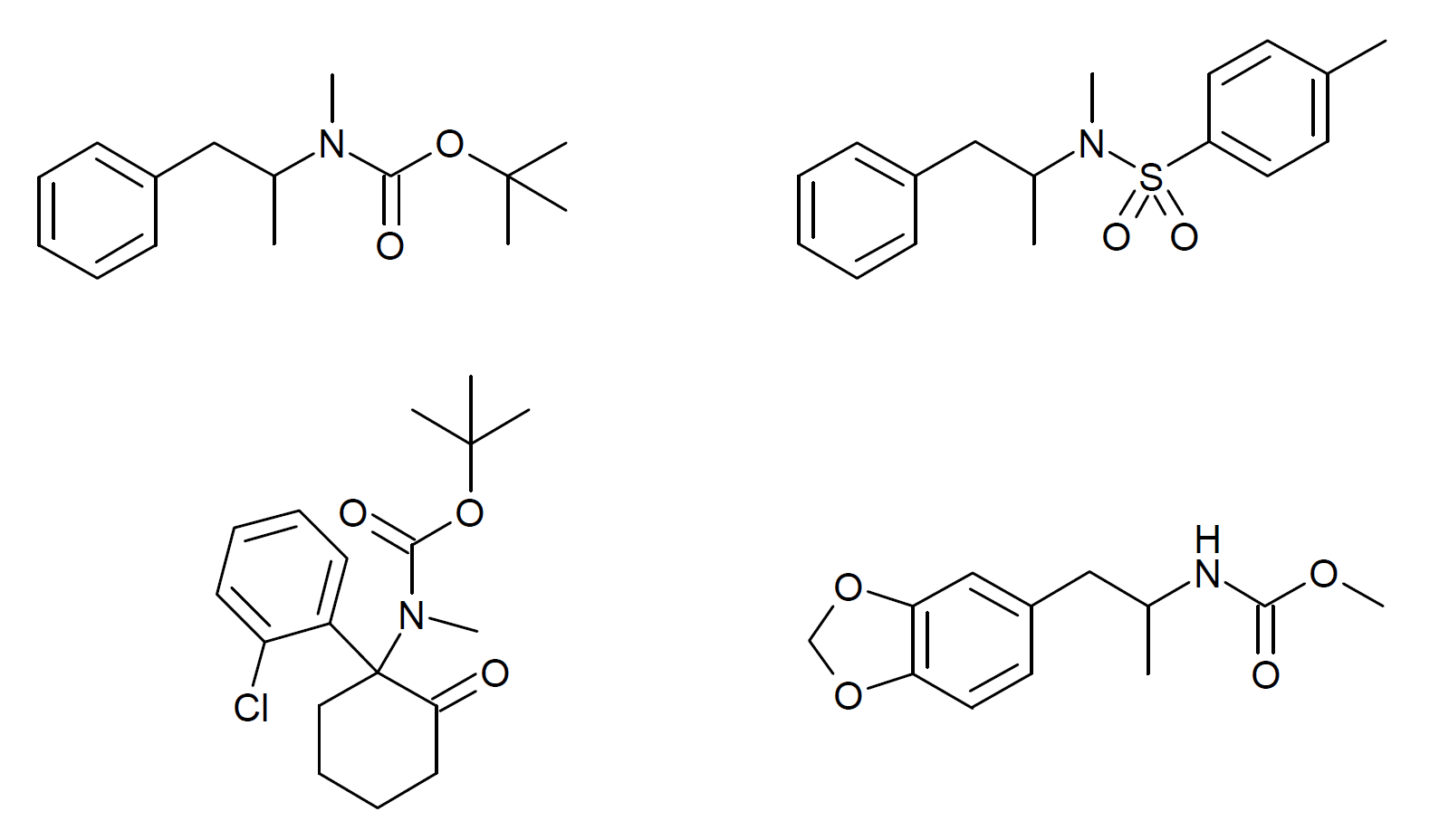
Chemical structures of N-t-BOC-methamphetamine, N-p-tosyl-methamphetamine, N-t-BOC-ketamine, and N-methoxycarbonyl-MDA

== Society and culture ==
=== Legal status ===
==== Asia ====
N-t-BOC-MDMA has been specifically listed as an illicit drug in Singapore and South Korea, but is also likely to be controlled by general drug analogue laws in various other countries.

==== Canada ====
N-t-BOC-MDMA is controlled substance in Canada under phenethylamine blanket-ban language.

==== United States ====
N-t-BOC-MDMA is not an explicitly controlled substance in the United States. However, it could be considered a controlled substance under the Federal Analogue Act if intended for human consumption.

== See also ==
- Substituted methylenedioxyphenethylamine
- 1-Boc-4-AP - a masked fentanyl precursor
- Gabapentin enacarbil
- 4-AcO-DMT
- Lys-MDA
- NBoc-DMT
- NB-5-MeO-MiPT
- NB-5-MeO-DALT
- Phenatine
