= 5-MeO-DMT =

Psychedelic drug

5-MeO-DMT INN: Mebufotenin

Clinical data
- Other names: 5-Methoxy-N,N-dimethyltryptamine; 5-Methoxy-N,N-DMT; 5-MeO-DMT; 5-OMe-DMT; MDMT; O-Methylbufotenin; Mebufotenin; Methylbufotenin; N,N,O-Trimethylserotonin; CT-4334; BPL-002; BPL-003; LSR-1019
- Routes of administration: Inhalation, insufflation, sublingual, rectal, intramuscular, intravenous, oral (with an MAOI like harmaline)
- Drug class: Non-selective serotonin receptor agonist; Serotonin 5-HT_{1A} receptor agonist; Serotonin 5-HT_{2A} receptor agonist; Serotonergic psychedelic; Hallucinogen
- ATC code: None

Legal status
- Legal status: AU: S9 (Prohibited substance); BR: Class F2 (Prohibited psychotropics); DE: Anlage I (Authorized scientific use only); UK: Class A; US: Schedule I; Illegal in China, Sweden, Turkey

Pharmacokinetic data
- Bioavailability: Oral: inactive (without an MAOI) or weak
- Metabolism: Oxidative deamination (MAO), O-demethylation (CYP2D6)
- Metabolites: Bufotenin
- Onset of action: Inhalation: seconds or 3–4 min (but up to 10–15 min); Intranasal: 3–15 min; Intramuscular: 1–6 min; Intravenous: ≤1 minute; Oral (with harmaline): 15–18 min
- Elimination half-life: Intranasal: 15–26 min; Sublingual: 28 min
- Duration of action: Inhalation: 5–30 min, but up to 1–2 hours; Intranasal: 45–70 min; Intramuscular: ≤60 min; Intravenous: 10 min; Oral (with harmaline) ≥3–4 hours

Identifiers
- IUPAC name: 2-(5-Methoxy-1H-indol-3-yl)-N,N-dimethylethanamine
- CAS Number: 1019-45-0
- PubChem CID: 1832
- IUPHAR/BPS: 145
- ChemSpider: 1766
- UNII: X0MKX3GWU9
- KEGG: C08309
- ChEBI: CHEBI:2086
- ChEMBL: ChEMBL7257
- CompTox Dashboard (EPA): DTXSID70144324
- ECHA InfoCard: 100.012.558

Chemical and physical data
- Formula: C_{13}H_{18}N_{2}O
- Molar mass: 218.300 g·mol^{−1}
- 3D model (JSmol): Interactive image
- SMILES: COc2ccc1[nH]cc(CCN(C)C)c1c2
- InChI: InChI=1S/C13H18N2O/c1-15(2)7-6-10-9-14-13-5-4-11(16-3)8-12(10)13/h4-5,8-9,14H,6-7H2,1-3H3; Key:ZSTKHSQDNIGFLM-UHFFFAOYSA-N

5-MeO-DMT, also known as 5-methoxy-N,N-dimethyltryptamine, as well as O-methylbufotenin or mebufotenin, is an atypical psychedelic drug, entheogen, and alkaloid of the tryptamine and 5-methoxytryptamine families. It is found naturally in a wide variety of plant species, and is also secreted by the glands of at least one toad species, the Colorado River toad (Incilius alvarius, formerly Bufo alvarius). It may occur naturally in humans as well. Like its close relatives dimethyltryptamine (DMT) and bufotenin (5-HO-DMT), it has been used as an entheogen in South America. Slang terms include five-methoxy, the power, bufo, and toad venom. The drug has been described as the most powerful psychedelic and, by journalist Michael Pollan, as the "Mount Everest of psychedelics".

5-MeO-DMT differs from most other serotonergic psychedelics in having much greater activity at the serotonin 5-HT_{1A} receptor in addition to the serotonin 5-HT_{2A} receptor. In relation to this, 5-MeO-DMT has been described as an "atypical" psychedelic and as producing subjective effects notably distinct from those of DMT and other psychedelics, for instance having a relative lack of visual effects. Nonetheless, 5-MeO-DMT reliably produces mystical experiences in most people who take it. Like DMT, 5-MeO-DMT is only active non-orally and has a very rapid onset and short duration. However, 5-MeO-DMT is 4- to 20-fold more potent than DMT in humans.

Adverse effects of 5-MeO-DMT include sickness, vomiting, headache, chest pressure, fatigue, anxiety, fear, terror, confusion, paranoia, crying, loss of awareness and motor control, and reactivations. The drug acts as a non-selective serotonin receptor agonist, including of the serotonin 5-HT_{1A} and 5-HT_{2A} receptors, among others. 5-MeO-DMT was first described by 1936, was first isolated from natural sources by 1959, and was first reported to be hallucinogenic by 1970. The use of 5-MeO-DMT-containing toad venom was first described in 1984. It is a controlled substance in some countries, for instance the United States, United Kingdom, Australia, and New Zealand. The drug is used recreationally and several deaths have been reported in association with its use. Use of 5-MeO-DMT is rare compared with other psychedelics, with only 0.003% of the United States general population having reported usage in their lifetime in 2019 (compared to 8.5% for psilocybin). 5-MeO-DMT is being developed for potential use in medicine in the treatment of neuropsychiatric disorders such as depression.

== Use and effects ==
5-MeO-DMT is used as a recreational drug and as an entheogen. It is not orally active, requiring a parenteral route such as smoking to produce effects. Other non-oral routes such as intravenous injection, intramuscular injection, rectal administration, sublingual administration, or intranasal administration have also less commonly been used. In addition to non-oral administration, 5-MeO-DMT can be combined with a monoamine oxidase inhibitor (MAOI) such as the reversible inhibitor of monoamine oxidase A (RIMA) harmaline to allow for oral activity and a much longer duration than it would have otherwise. However, combination of 5-MeO-DMT with MAOIs can also result in accidental overdose, including instances of serotonin syndrome and death. In addition to pure synthetic 5-MeO-DMT, it is often used by smoking in the form of the venom taken from the Colorado River toad (Incilius alvarius, formerly Bufo alvarius and also known as the Sonoran Desert toad).

In his book TiHKAL (Tryptamines I Have Known and Loved), Alexander Shulgin lists 5-MeO-DMT's dose as 6 to 20 mg smoked or 2 to 3 mg by intravenous injection and its duration as 1 to 2 hours. Other sources state the dose of 5-MeO-DMT to be 2 to 15 mg smoked and its duration as 5 to 20 minutes or 12 minutes typically. It has been described as having a steep dose–response curve. 5-MeO-DMT is not orally active at doses of up to at least 35 mg and is almost always used via smoking. However, another report, by Jonathan Ott, found 5-MeO-DMT to be orally active at a dose of 30 mg. The onset of 5-MeO-DMT smoked is 8 seconds to 1 minute, with peak effects occurring after 2 to 3 minutes, although some report an onset or build-up of as long as 10 to 15 minutes. The main effects when smoked last about 10 minutes, with a total duration of 20 to 60 minutes. Taken by intravenous injection, the onset of 5-MeO-DMT is within 1 minute and the duration was 10 minutes in one instance. Intravenous injection of 5-MeO-DMT has not yet been formally studied. With harmaline doses of 70 to 150 mg orally, 5-MeO-DMT becomes orally active at doses of 10 to 25 mg, the onset is 15 to 18 minutes, peak effects occur after 1.5 hours, and the duration is at least 3 or 4 hours. In addition, harmaline at sufficient doses such as 150 mg or more can add its own hallucinogenic effects to the experience.

The effects of 5-MeO-DMT have been reported by Shulgin. The perceptual effects included no noticeable visual effects or sensory involvement, not seeing anything whilst eyes shut except a bright white light, inability to see in general, multi-color phosphene visuals filling entire visual field, a certain resonance of auditory perception or electrical buzzing that synchronized with visual perception, slightly diminished hearing, ear ringing, feeling barraged by stimuli, rush, and a tremendous and intense sense of speed and acceleration. Other effects included a "white-out" or "singularity" experience (as opposed to a "black-out"), mental activity almost absent, mind completely referenceless, cosmic consciousness type of experience, feelings of longing for connection and transcendence, feeling like one is experiencing all possible thoughts and realities simultaneously, feeling like one is experiencing a very large number of objects, situations, and emotions all at once instead of only one at a time, feeling like one is an ocean, intense depersonalization, impressive recall of early memories and emotional significance of these memories, time constriction (such as experiencing 40 minutes as mere seconds), and insights.

Effects related to spatial and bodily awareness included altered body perception, normal physical perceptions dissolving away from awareness, loss of contact with one's body and surroundings, feeling like one was not there in one's body or in time, feeling like all the blood in one's body had turned to concrete, and not being able to tell if eyes were closed or open. Emotional effects included a sense of excitement, feelings of awe and wonder, feeling amazed or "blown away", feelings of love and energy, feelings of ecstasy, emotions synchronized with visuals, strong feelings of gratitude for the experience, feeling overwhelmed, feeling "scared the hell out", feeling the "energy of terror", screaming in one's head, fear of death, feeling like one had died or killed themselves, feeling at risk of psychic damage, and relief upon coming down. Further effects included an intensity greater than anything one has experienced before, simply the most intense experience possible, feeling like the entire universe had exploded through one's consciousness, feeling like there is no possibility of examining the experience, an inability to judge by any method of the mind, feeling conked on the head, little or no memory of the experience, and loss of continuity of consciousness like a black-out from too much alcohol.

Behavioral effects included falling over while sitting, curling up in a fetal position, squirming and writhing around, making frightening noises, and alarming other people. Physical side effects included physical weakness, shakiness, tremors, shivers emanating from the head, center, or heart, and slight nausea. The taste when smoking was described as mild, with none of the plastic taste of dimethyltryptamine (DMT). In the case of an unspecified large overdose smoked, the person lapsed into a coma-like state, their face turned purple, they stopped breathing and had to be resuscitated multiple times, and they experienced a several-day psychosis necessitating antipsychotics.

5-MeO-DMT was described by Shulgin as being remarkably potent, more potent than DMT, and as having a slightly faster onset than DMT when smoked. More specifically, it is 4- to 20-fold more potent than DMT. The drug is said to be a very strong and quite intense hallucinogen. There is an ability to break through to a similar space as DMT, but it is said to be "more like receiving grace" and to be much more relaxed than DMT and less terrifying. One report commented that 5-MeO-DMT was like adding the MDMA (ecstasy) experience to DMT. 5-MeO-DMT was one of the only psychedelics in TiHKAL that resulted in a plus-four experience on the Shulgin Rating Scale. Another psychedelic tryptamine that produced similar effects to 5-MeO-DMT was 5-MeO-MiPT at sufficiently high doses smoked. 5-MeO-DMT seems to be like a cross between DMT and 5-MeO-pyr-T in terms of its effects. The latter shares many commonalities with 5-MeO-DMT, but has few or no psychedelic effects and has pronounced negative effects. Other 5-methoxytryptamines like 5-MeO-DET and 5-MeO-DPT were plagued by dose-limiting side effects that resulted in Shulgin having an unfavorable impression of them, whereas 5-MeO-DiPT and 5-MeO-DALT produced only light psychedelic effects.

In other published sources besides TiHKAL, the subjective effects of 5-MeO-DMT are described as distinct from those of DMT and other psychedelics. Whereas DMT is described as producing more "information-rich" experiences, with "rich sensory phenomenology", visuals, and experiences of encountering entities and visiting other worlds, 5-MeO-DMT is described as having a relative lack of visual effects, producing a sense of "nothingness", and causing experiences that are said to be "content-free" and sometimes known as "whiteouts". These experiences have been described as "beyond ordinary human comprehension", with a subjective impression of a void or amnesia of the experience. In spite of this however, some have described the experiences as orgasmic, ecstatic, and blissful, whereas others have described them as terror or "information overwhelm". As with DMT and other psychedelics, the experiences with 5-MeO-DMT are often described as overwhelming, profound, spiritual, religious, and/or mystical. The experiences of 5-MeO-DMT have also been related to the experience of ecstatic seizures. 5-MeO-DMT has been described as the most powerful psychedelic and by Michael Pollan as the "Mount Everest of psychedelics".

The phenomenology of 5-MeO-DMT given intransally has been formally clinically studied in a phase 1 clinical trial more recently. It is described as having a rapid onset of 8 to 15 minutes, a short duration of 45 to 60 minutes, distinctive subjective effects from other psychedelics, a relative lack of visual effects, strong emotional and bodily experiences, emotional breakthroughs, and personal insights, among other effects.

== Adverse effects ==
5-MeO-DMT has various possible adverse effects. It produces much higher rates of fear and anxiety than other serotonergic psychedelics like LSD, psilocybin, mescaline, and dimethyltryptamine (DMT).

== Overdose ==
There have been cases of death with 5-MeO-DMT. The estimated lethal dose of 5-MeO-DMT relative to a typical recreational dose in humans is unknown. The median lethal dose (LD_{50}) in animals varies widely, ranging from 1 to 5 mg/kg i.v. in sheep to 48 mg/kg i.v. in mice. In one case, combination of 5-MeO-DMT with harmala alkaloids, which act as monoamine oxidase inhibitors (MAOIs), as well as with other drugs, resulted in death. However, the exact contribution of 5-MeO-DMT in this case is difficult to determine.

== Interactions ==
5-MeO-DMT can be strongly potentiated by combination with monoamine oxidase inhibitors (MAOIs). In addition, it can become orally active with an extended duration in combination with MAOIs. These interactions have the potential to result in serious toxicity and death.

== Pharmacology ==
=== Pharmacodynamics ===
Activities of 5-MeO-DMT
Target	Affinity (K_{i}, nM)
5-HT_{1A}	1.9–28 (K_{i}); 3.4–1,060 (EC_{50}); 68–98% (E_{max})
5-HT_{1B}	14–351 (K_{i}); 1.53 (EC_{50}); 78% (E_{max})
5-HT_{1D}	2.3–20 (K_{i}); 37 (EC_{50}); 98% (E_{max})
5-HT_{1E}	360–741 (K_{i}); 92–160 (EC_{50}); 119% (E_{max})
5-HT_{1F}	37 (K_{i}); 14 (EC_{50}); 93% (E_{max})
5-HT_{2A}	15–2,011 (K_{i}); 1.76–784 (EC_{50}); 82–106% (E_{max})
5-HT_{2B}	13–3,884 (K_{i}); 5.9–30 (EC_{50}); 21–73% (E_{max})
5-HT_{2C}	42–538 (K_{i}); 7.1–31 (EC_{50}); 84–94% (E_{max})
5-HT_{3}	>10,000
5-HT_{4}	>10,000 (EC_{50})
5-HT_{5A}	277–596 (K_{i}); 110 (EC_{50}); 107% (E_{max})
5-HT_{6}	6.5–>10,000 (K_{i}); 0.24 (EC_{50}); 125% (E_{max})
5-HT_{7}	3.9–30 (K_{i}); 65.7 (EC_{50}); 107% (E_{max})
MT_{1}	210 (K_{i}); 257 (EC_{50})
MT_{2}	16 (K_{i}); 112 (EC_{50})
α_{1A}	4,373–>10,000
α_{1B}	2,188–>10,000
α_{1D}	>10,000
α_{2A}	574–1,890
α_{2B}	430–>10,000
α_{2C}	206–2,174
β_{1}	>10,000
β_{2}	2,679–>10,000
β_{3}	>10,000
D_{1}	80–>10,000
D_{2}	3,562–>10,000
D_{3}	498–>10,000
D_{4}	1,422–>10,000
D_{5}	>10,000
H_{1}	7,580–>10,000
H_{2}–H_{4}	>10,000
M_{1}–M_{5}	>10,000
σ_{1}	>10,000
σ_{2}	>10,000
MOR	>10,000
DOR	>10,000
KOR	>10,000
SERT	2,032–>10,000 (K_{i}); 2,184–>10,000 (IC_{50}); 10,000 (EC_{50})
NET	2,859–>10,000 (K_{i}); 10,000 (IC_{50}); 10,000 (EC_{50})
DAT	>10,000 (K_{i}); 10,000 (IC_{50}); 10,000 (EC_{50})
Notes: The smaller the value, the more avidly the drug binds to the site. Proteins are mostly but not exclusively human. Refs:

5-MeO-DMT is a methoxylated derivative of dimethyltryptamine (DMT). While most common psychedelics are believed to primarily elicit psychological effects through agonism of serotonin 5-HT_{2A} receptors, 5-MeO-DMT shows 1,000-fold greater affinity for the serotonin 5-HT_{1A} receptor over the serotonin 5-HT_{2A} receptor. In line with its affinity for serotonin 5-HT_{1A} receptors, 5-MeO-DMT is extremely potent at suppressing the firing of dorsal raphe nucleus serotonin neurons. Further, its activity in rats was attenuated with the selective serotonin 5-HT_{1A} receptor antagonist WAY-100635, while selective serotonin 5-HT_{2A} receptor antagonist volinanserin failed to demonstrate any change. Additional mechanisms of action such as inhibition of monoamine reuptake may also be involved in its effects.

Similarly to other serotonergic psychedelics, 5-MeO-DMT is a non-selective serotonin receptor agonist, including of the serotonin 5-HT_{1A}, 5-HT_{2A}, 5-HT_{2B}, and 5-HT_{2C} receptors, among others. It shows pronounced biased agonism at the serotonin 5-HT_{2C} receptor. The drug is 4- to 10-fold more potent as a hallucinogen than DMT in humans. In contrast to most serotonergic psychedelics however, it has been said that it is unclear that the hallucinogenic effects of 5-MeO-DMT are principally mediated by activation of the serotonin 5-HT_{2A} receptor. In any case, 5-MeO-DMT does still activate the serotonin 5-HT_{2A} receptor and does still produce psychedelic effects.

It has been proposed that 5-MeO-DMT be considered an "atypical" psychedelic. This relates to the fact that 5-MeO-DMT has 100- to 1,000-fold selectivity for the serotonin 5-HT_{1A} receptor over the serotonin 5-HT_{2A} receptor and that the actions of 5-MeO-DMT appear to be primarily mediated by serotonin 5-HT_{1A} receptor activation. For example, the potencies of drugs substituting for 5-MeO-DMT in drug discrimination assays is well-correlated with their serotonin 5-HT_{1A} receptor affinities, and the discriminative stimulus effects of 5-MeO-DMT are almost completely blocked (~80%) by serotonin 5-HT_{1A} receptor antagonists like WAY-100,635. However, there is partial generalization of 5-MeO-DMT to the selective serotonin 5-HT_{2} receptor agonist (–)-DOM in animals. In addition, the selective serotonin 5-HT_{2A} receptor antagonist volinanserin subtly reduces (~20%) the 5-MeO-DMT interoceptive cue, suggesting a minor contribution of this receptor. Selective antagonists of other serotonin receptors, including the serotonin 5-HT_{1B}, 5-HT_{2B}, and 5-HT_{2C} receptors, had no effect on the discriminative stimulus effects of 5-MeO-DMT. In accordance with the preceding findings, which suggest effects mediated primarily by the serotonin 5-HT_{1A} receptor and to a lesser extent by the serotonin 5-HT_{2A} receptor, 5-MeO-DMT is reported to produce distinct subjective effects compared to DMT and other psychedelics in humans.

Although 5-MeO-DMT shows dramatically higher affinity for the serotonin 5-HT_{1A} receptor than for the serotonin 5-HT_{2A} receptor, the situation appears to be very different in terms of its actual activational potencies at these receptors. Its EC_{50} values have been found to be 1.80 to 3.87 nM at the serotonin 5-HT_{2A} receptor and 3.92 to 1,060 nM at the serotonin 5-HT_{1A} receptor. For comparison, the EC_{50} values of DMT were found to be 38.3 nM at the serotonin 5-HT_{2A} receptor and >10,000 nM at the serotonin 5-HT_{1A} receptor in one of the same studies. Hence, 5-MeO-DMT appears to be similarly potent or as much as 200-fold more potent as an agonist of the serotonin 5-HT_{2A} receptor than of the serotonin 5-HT_{1A} receptor. In addition, 5-MeO-DMT is 10-fold more potent than DMT as an agonist of the serotonin 5-HT_{2A} receptor.

Besides serotonin receptors, 5-MeO-DMT is an agonist of the melatonin MT_{1} and MT_{2} receptors. Unlike DMT, 5-MeO-DMT is not a ligand or agonist of the sigma receptors. In contrast to certain other tryptamines, 5-MeO-DMT is inactive as a monoamine releasing agent, including of serotonin, norepinephrine, and dopamine. However, it is a weak serotonin reuptake inhibitor, with an IC_{50} value of 2,184 nM. Conversely, it is inactive as a dopamine and norepinephrine reuptake inhibitor (IC_{50} = >10,000 nM).

It has been theorized that 5-MeO-DMT may robustly stimulate oxytocin secretion via its serotonin 5-HT_{1A} receptor agonism and that this might be involved in some of its effects, such as reported feelings of love, unity, and connectedness. Relatedly, strongly increased oxytocin levels appear to play a key role in the entactogenic effects of MDMA in humans. A clinical trial is underway by Matthias Liechti and colleagues in Basel, Switzerland that will measure oxytocin levels with 5-MeO-DMT in humans.

Similarly to DMT, but in contrast to most other psychedelics, like LSD and psilocybin, there appears to be very little development of tolerance with 5-MeO-DMT. In fact, there may even be sensitization to the effects of 5-MeO-DMT. The lack of tolerance development with 5-MeO-DMT may be due to biased agonism of the serotonin 5-HT_{2A} receptor. More specifically, 5-MeO-DMT activates the G_{q} signaling pathway of the serotonin 5-HT_{2A} receptor with much less potency in recruiting β-arrestin2. Activation of β-arrestin2 is linked to receptor downregulation and tachyphylaxis.

=== Pharmacokinetics ===
==== Absorption ====
5-MeO-DMT is not orally active and must be administered parenterally.

==== Distribution ====
5-MeO-DMT is lipophilic and is thought to easily cross the blood–brain barrier. Accordingly, 5-MeO-DMT readily accumulates in the brain in animals with levels higher than in blood. This is in notable contrast to bufotenin (5-HO-DMT or N,N-dimethylserotonin) and serotonin (5-HT), which are hydrophilic and have varying degrees of peripheral selectivity.

==== Metabolism ====
Bufotenin is an active metabolite of 5-MeO-DMT, formed by O-demethylation by cytochrome P450 CYP2D6. Bufotenin notably has much higher affinity for the serotonin 5-HT_{2A} receptor than 5-MeO-DMT itself. However, bufotenin does not seem to be extensively produced from 5-MeO-DMT in the brain. In addition, peripherally formed bufotenin is less able to exert central effects due to its relative peripheral selectivity in terms of crossing into the brain. Hence, the involvement of bufotenin in the psychoactive effects of 5-MeO-DMT is uncertain.

The metabolism of 5-MeO-DMT can be dramatically reduced and its levels markedly augmented and prolonged by monoamine oxidase inhibitors (MAOIs). In addition, MAOIs allow 5-MeO-DMT to become orally active in humans. Combining 5-MeO-DMT with MAOIs has sometimes resulted in serotonin syndrome and death in humans.

==== Elimination ====
The elimination half-life of 5-MeO-DMT has been found to be 15 to 26 minutes intranasally and 28 minutes sublingually. Data are not available for other routes such as inhalation or intravenous administration. 5-MeO-DMT appears to have a longer half-life than dimethyltryptamine (DMT), with the two drugs having half-lives of approximately 20 minutes and 5 minutes, respectively.

== Chemistry ==
5-MeO-DMT, also known as 5-methoxy-N,N-dimethyltryptamine, is a substituted tryptamine derivative. It is the 5-methoxylated derivative of N,N-dimethyltryptamine (DMT), the N,N-dimethylated derivative of 5-methoxytryptamine (5-MT; mexamine), and the O-methylated derivative of bufotenin (5-HO-DMT).

=== Properties ===
5-MeO-DMT has a relatively high experimental log P of 3.30.

=== Synthesis ===
The chemical synthesis of 5-MeO-DMT has been described.

=== Analogues and derivatives ===
Analogues and derivatives of 5-MeO-DMT include dimethyltryptamine (DMT), 5-methoxytryptamine (5-MT or 5-MeO-T), 5-MeO-NMT, 5-MeO-MET, 5-MeO-DET, 5-MeO-MPT, 5-MeO-EPT, 5-MeO-DPT, 5-MeO-MiPT, 5-MeO-EiPT, 5-MeO-PiPT, 5-MeO-DiPT, 5-MeO-MALT, 5-MeO-DALT, 5-MeO-pyr-T, 5-EtO-DMT, 5-MeO-2-TMT (2-methyl-5-MeO-DMT), EMDT (2-ethyl-5-MeO-DMT), psilomethoxin (4-hydroxy-5-MeO-DMT; 5-methoxypsilocin), 5-MeO-AMT, α,N,N,O-TeMS (5-MeO-α,N,N-TMT), 4-MeO-DMT, 6-MeO-DMT, 7-MeO-DMT, and dimemebfe (5-MeO-BFE), among others.

Some cyclized tryptamine and/or partial lysergamide derivatives of 5-MeO-DMT include N-DEAOP-5-MeO-NMT, 6-MeO-RU-28306, 6-methoxyharmalan, ibogaine, and 12-methoxy-LSD, among others.

A deuterated isotopologue of 5-MeO-DMT is 5-MeO-DMT-d4 (α,α,β,β-tetradeutero-5-MeO-DMT). Prodrugs of 5-MeO-DMT such as 1-acetyl-5-MeO-DMT and N-phosphonooxymethyl-5-MeO-DMT (N-POM-5-MeO-DMT) have also been described.

== Natural occurrence ==
=== Plants ===
Plant sources of 5-MeO-DMT
Family	Species
Rutaceae	Dictyoloma incanescens, Limonia acidissima, Melicope leptococca
Fabaceae	Anadenanthera peregrina, Acacia auriculiformis, Acacia victoriae, Desmodium gangeticum, Lespedeza bicolor, Mimosa pudica, Mucuna pruriens, Phyllodium pulchellum
Poaceae	Phalaris tuberosa
Malpighiaceae	Diplopterys cabrerana
Cactaceae	Echinocereus salm-dyckianus, Echinocereus triglochidiatus
Myristicaceae	Horsfieldia superba, Iryanthera macrophylla, Osteophloeum platyspermum, Virola theiodora, V. calophylla, V. multinervia, V. peruviana, V. rufula, V. venosa

There are various known plant sources of 5-MeO-DMT.

=== Toads ===
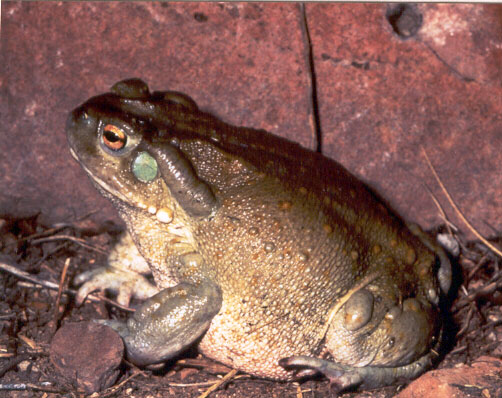
Incilius alvarius (formerly Bufo alvarius), also known as the Colorado River toad or as the Sonoran Desert toad, produces 5-MeO-DMT in its venom.

Incilius alvarius, formerly known as Bufo alvarius and also known as the Colorado River toad or as the Sonoran Desert toad, is a noted animal source of 5-MeO-DMT, first described in Bufo Alvarius: the Psychedelic Toad of the Sonoran Desert in 1984 by Ken Nelson (writing under the pseudonym of Albert Most). Smoking the parotoid secretions of the animal produces a powerful and short-lived psychedelic experience. The smoking of I. alvarius secretions should not be confused with the urban legend of toad licking. Since 1983, the animal has become a popular source of 5-MeO-DMT for recreational or spiritual purposes. Unfortunately, this increased demand and use of the toads as a source of 5-MeO-DMT has put strain on their populations. Concerned with the ecological impacts of the growing use of I. alvarius secretions as a source of 5-MeO-DMT, Ken Nelson would later advocate for the use of synthetic 5-MeO-DMT and conservation of the Colorado River Toad.

=== Fungi ===
Fungal sources of 5-MeO-DMT include Amanita citrina and Amanita porphyria.

== History ==
5-MeO-DMT was first synthesized by Toshio Hoshino in 1935. It was isolated from the flowering plant Dictyoloma incanescens in 1959. The drug was subsequently isolated from numerous other plant, fungal, and animal sources over time. The behavioral effects of 5-MeO-DMT in animals were first reported by 1961. In 1965, 5-MeO-DMT was reported to be the main component of the hallucinogenic snuff known variously as parica, epena, or yakee that is prepared and used from the resin of the Virola theiodora tree by indigenous people in Northern South America. It was isolated from the toad Incilius alvarius (formerly Bufo alvarius and also known as the Sonoran Desert toad, Colorado River toad, or simply bufo) by Vittorio Erspamer by 1965.

Alexander Shulgin briefly reported that 5-MeO-DMT was hallucinogenic in humans, via parenteral but not oral routes, in 1970, with additional details published later on. Albert Most, real name Ken Nelson, was the first to describe the use of Incilius alvarius toad venom as a psychedelic in his published pamphlet Bufo Alvarius: the Psychedelic Toad of the Sonoran Desert in 1984. Subsequently, Andrew Weil and Wade Davis, in part citing the pamphlet, described the psychoactive effects of the toad in the scientific literature in 1992. In addition, they described the finding as the first instance of a psychedelic from an animal source to be discovered. Recreational use of the toads, beyond the pamphlet, was encountered by the late 1980s and became a media sensation. 5-MeO-DMT became a controlled substance in the United States in 2009.

== Society and culture ==
=== Names ===
5-MeO-DMT is the common informal name of the drug and an acronym of one of its chemical names. Mebufotenin is the generic name of the drug and its INN. Other names can include O-methylbufotenin, O-methyl-5-HO-DMT, and O,N,N-trimethylserotonin.

=== Religious use ===
The Church of the Tree of Life, founded in California in 1971 by John Mann but now defunct, declared the use of 5-MeO-DMT to be a sacrament. From approximately 1971 to the late 1980s, 5-MeO-DMT was discreetly available to its members. Between 1970 and 1990, smoking of 5-MeO-DMT on parsley was probably one of the two most common forms of ingestion in the United States.

=== Legal status ===
==== Australia ====
As a structural analog of N,N-dimethyltryptamine (DMT), 5-MeO-DMT is a Schedule 9 prohibited substance under the Poisons Standard.

==== Canada ====
5-MeO-DMT is not an explicitly nor implicitly controlled substance in Canada as of 2025.

==== China ====
As of October 2015, 5-MeO-DMT is a controlled substance in China.

==== Germany ====
As of 2001 5-MeO-DMT is listed as a controlled substance. Attachement I BtMG. BGBl. I 2001, 1180 - 1186;

==== Sweden ====
The Swedish government classified 5-MeO-DMT, listed as 5-metoxi-N,N-dimetyltryptamin (5-MeO-DMT) in their regulation SFS 2004:696, as "health hazard" under the Lagen om förbud mot vissa hälsofarliga varor (Act on the Prohibition of Certain Goods Dangerous to Health) in October 2004, making it illegal to sell or possess.

==== Turkey ====
5-MeO-DMT has been controlled in Turkey since December 2013.

==== United States ====
5-MeO-DMT was made a Schedule I controlled substance in January 2011.

== Research ==
Preliminary clinical findings suggest that 5-MeO-DMT might have antidepressant and anxiolytic effects.

A 2019 European study with 42 volunteers showed that a single inhalation of 5-MeO-DMT produced sustained enhancement of satisfaction with life, and easing of anxiety, depression, and post-traumatic stress disorder (PTSD). A 2018 study found that a single dose of 5-MeO-DMT induced neurogenesis in mice.

=== Depression ===
5-MeO-DMT is being developed and evaluated for potential therapeutic effects in patients with treatment-resistant depression (TRD). Biopharmaceutical company GH Research has sponsored a completed phase 1 study in healthy volunteers and phase 1/2 study in TRD patients where 87.5% of patients with TRD were brought into remission on day 7 in the phase 2 part of the study. GH Research is currently planning a phase 2b study in TRD patients and have received approval for studies in patients with bipolar II disorder and a current depressive episode and patients with postpartum depression.

In February 2025, GH Research announced that their Phase 2b clinical trial of GH001, met its primary endpoint in patients with TRD. The trial demonstrated a placebo-adjusted reduction of 15.5 points on the Montgomery-Åsberg Depression Rating Scale (MADRS) at day 8, with 57.7% of patients achieving remission compared to 0% in the placebo group. The trial also met all secondary endpoints, and the treatment was well-tolerated with no serious adverse events reported. In 2026, the FDA allowed advanced trials for GH001.

Beckley Psytech in collaboration with King's College London evaluated the safety and tolerability of intranasal 5-MeO-DMT in healthy subjects, in a phase 1 study. Beckley Psytech CEO Cosmo Feilding-Mellen sees a potential in the short-acting nature of 5-MeO-DMT compared to psilocybin: "Requiring one or two therapists to sit in a room with a single patient for the entire duration of an MDMA or psilocybin experience, which is essentially a whole working day, is probably going to be very resource-intensive and expensive. There is already a global shortage of psychotherapists, and this poses a potential bottleneck to patient access in the future." The research initiative by AtaiBeckley, received a Breakthrough Therapy designation by the FDA for BPL-003, an intranasal spray containing 5-MeO-DMT, for Treatment-Resistant Depression. AtaiBeckley's study has completed its Phase 2b stage.

Ultra-short-acting psychedelics like dimethyltryptamine (DMT), bretisilocin and 5-MeO-DMT may be advantageous compared to longer-acting psychedelics like psilocybin in terms of practicality for use as therapeutic interventions in clinical settings.

Concerns have been raised about the potential use of 5-MeO-DMT in medicine due to the extreme and frequently challenging natures of the experiences.

== See also ==
- Substituted tryptamine
- List of entheogens
- Hamilton's Pharmacopeia
