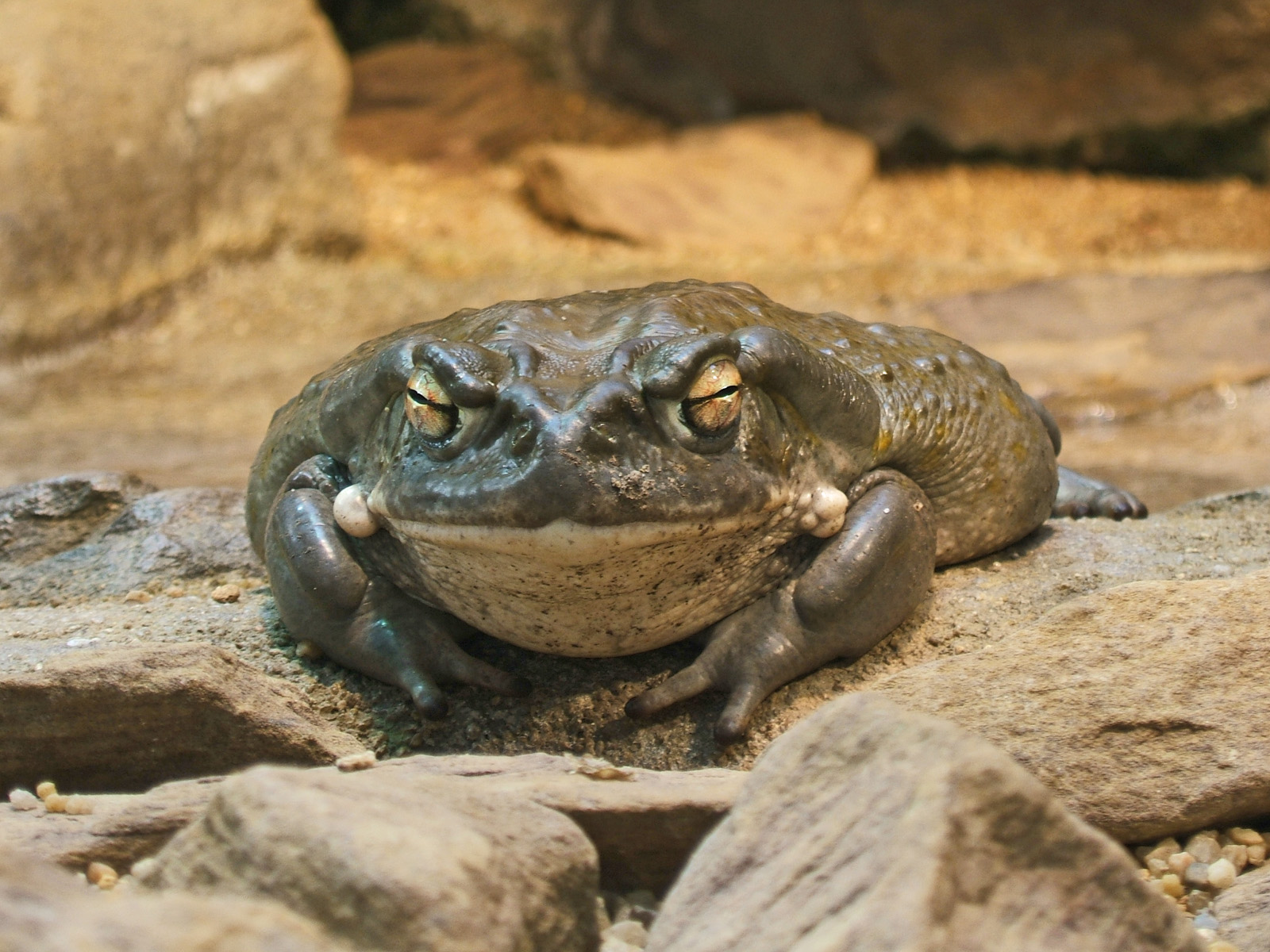

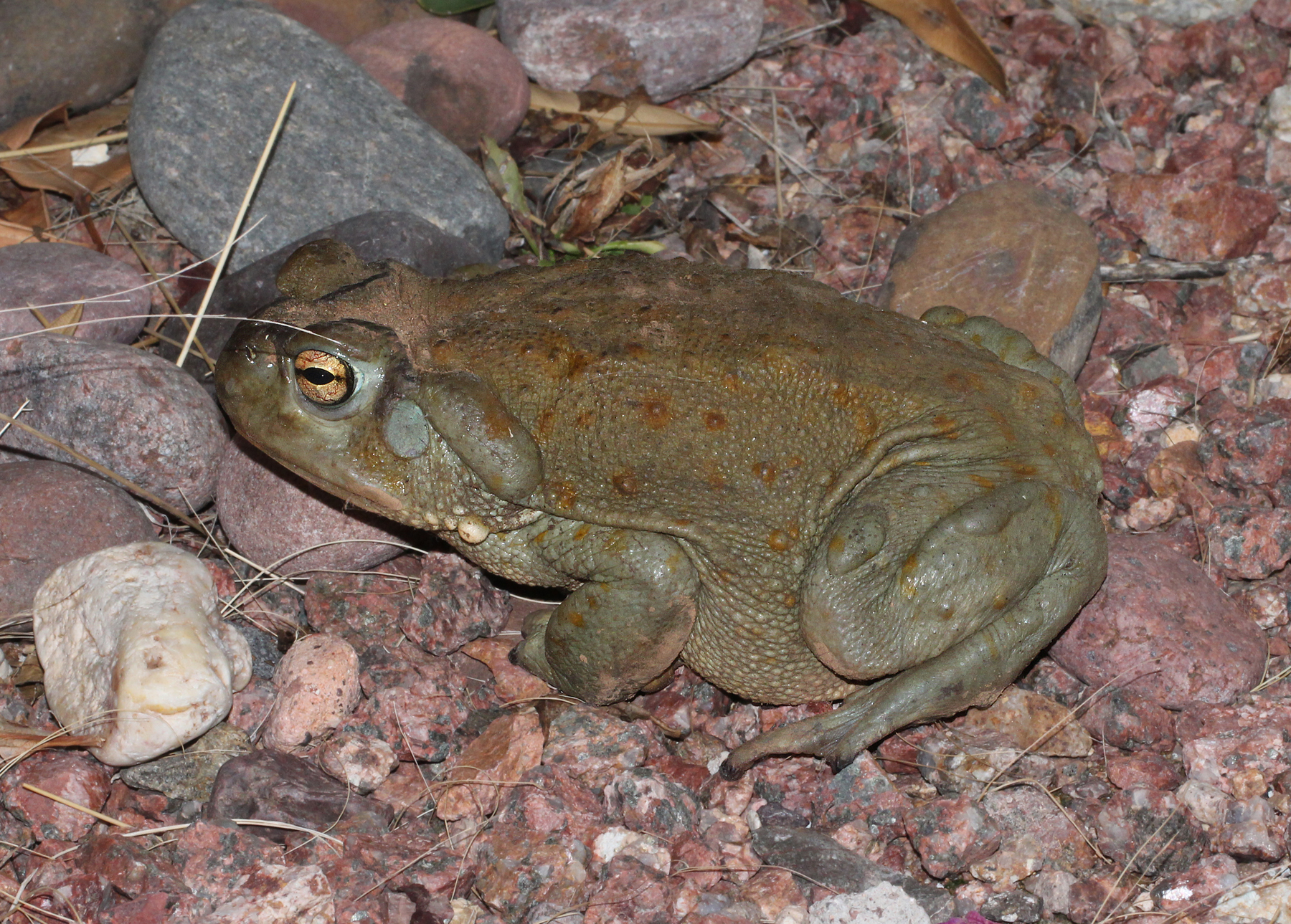

Conservation status
- Least Concern (IUCN 3.1)

- Secure (NatureServe)

Scientific classification
- Kingdom: Animalia
- Phylum: Chordata
- Class: Amphibia
- Order: Anura
- Family: Bufonidae
- Genus: Incilius
- Species: I. alvarius

Binomial name
- Incilius alvarius (Girard, 1859)

Synonyms
- Bufo alvarius Girard in Baird, 1859; Phrynoidis alvarius – Cope, 1862; Cranopsis alvaria – Frost et al., 2006; Ollotis alvaria – Frost et al., 2006

= Colorado River toad =

Species of amphibian

The Colorado River toad (Incilius alvarius), (previously Bufo alvarius) also known as the Sonoran Desert toad, is a toad species found in northwestern Mexico and the southwestern United States. It is well known for its ability to exude toxins that have psychoactive properties from glands within its skin.

The toad's scientific name was formerly Bufo alvarius, the name by which the toad is generally still known. In the early 2000s, the increasingly important role of molecular genetic techniques in taxonomy and their ability to examine phylogenetic relationships allowed scientists to discover numerous distinct genera within the old Bufo group.

The Colorado River toad's name was subsequently changed to Incilius alvarius.

== Description ==
The Colorado River toad can grow to about 190 millimetres (7.5 in) long and is the largest toad in the United States apart from the non-native cane toad (Rhinella marina). It has a smooth, leathery skin and is olive green or mottled brown in color. Just behind the large golden eye with a horizontal pupil is a bulging kidney-shaped parotoid gland. Below this is a large circular pale green area which is the tympanum or ear drum. By the corner of the mouth there is a white wart and there are white glands on the legs. All these glands produce toxic secretions. Its call is described as, "a weak, low-pitched toot, lasting less than a second."

Dogs (Canis familiaris) that have attacked toads have suffered paralysis or even death. Raccoons (Procyon lotor) have learned to pull a toad away from a pond by the back leg, turn it on its back and start feeding on its belly, a strategy that keeps the raccoon well away from the poison glands. Unlike other vertebrates, this amphibian obtains water mostly by osmotic absorption across its abdomen. Toads in the family Bufonidae have a region of skin known as "the seat patch", which extends from mid abdomen to the hind legs and is specialized for rapid rehydration. Most of the rehydration is done through absorption of water from small pools or wet objects.

== Distribution and habitat ==
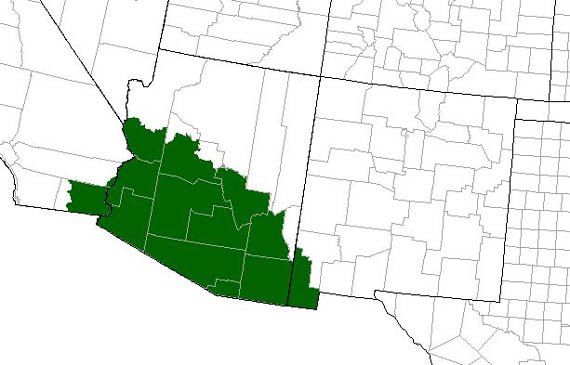
Range of Incilius alvarius in the United States

In the United States, the Colorado River toad is found in the lower Colorado River and the Gila River catchment areas, in extreme southwestern New Mexico and much of southern Arizona. It is considered possibly extirpated from California. In Mexico, the toad is found in the states of Sonora, Sinaloa, and Chihuahua. It lives in both desert and semi-arid areas throughout its range. It is semiaquatic and is often found in streams, near springs, in canals and drainage ditches, and under water troughs. The Colorado River toad is known to breed in artificial water bodies (e.g., flood control impoundments, reservoirs) and as a result, the distributions and breeding habitats of these species may have been recently altered in south-central Arizona. It often makes its home in rodent burrows and is nocturnal.

== Biology ==
The Colorado River toad is sympatric with the spadefoot toad (Scaphiopus spp.), Great Plains toad (Anaxyrus cognatus), red-spotted toad (Anaxyrus punctatus), and Woodhouse's toad (Anaxyrus woodhousei). Like many other toads, they are active foragers and feed on invertebrates, lizards, small mammals, and amphibians. The most active season for toads is May–September, due to greater rainfalls (needed for breeding purposes). The age of I. alvarius individuals in a population at Adobe Dam in Maricopa County, Arizona, ranged from 2 to 4 years; other species of toad have a lifespan of 4 to 5 years. The taxonomic affinities of I. alvarius remain unclear, but immunologically, it is similarly close to the boreas and valliceps groups.

== Breeding ==
The breeding season starts in July, when the rainy season begins, and can last up to August. Normally, 1–3 days after the rain is when toads begin to lay eggs in ponds, slow-moving streams, temporary pools or man-made structures that hold water. Eggs are 1.6 mm in diameter, 5–7 mm apart, and encased in a long single tube of jelly with a loose but distinct outline. The female toad can lay up to 8,000 eggs.

== Psychotropic uses ==
The toad's primary defense system are glands that produce a poison that may be potent enough to kill a grown dog. These parotoid glands also produce 5-methoxy-N,N-dimethyltryptamine (5-MeO-DMT) and bufotenin (which is named after the Bufo genus of toads); both of these chemicals belong to the family of hallucinogenic tryptamines.

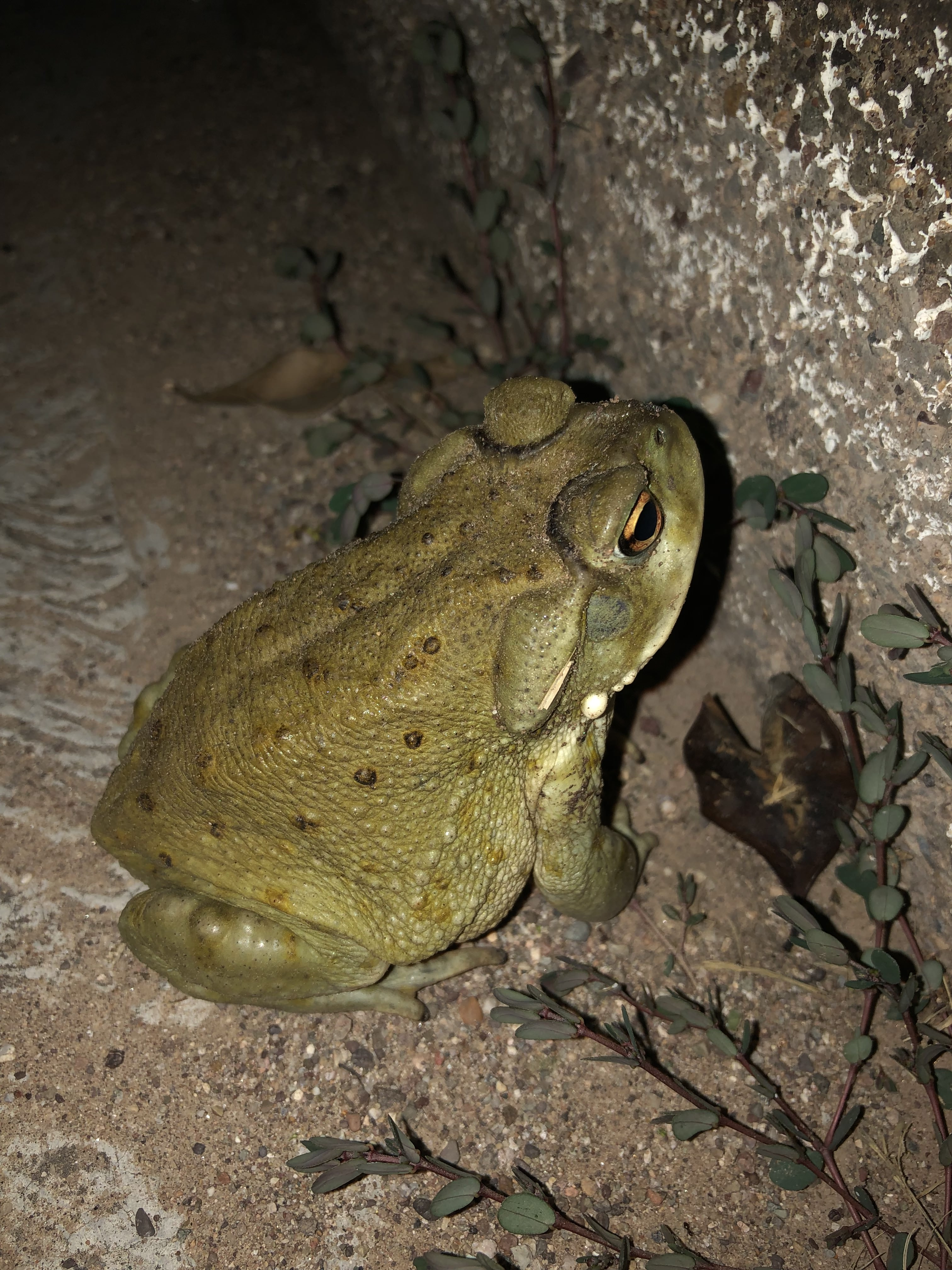
Sonoran Desert toad in Sonora

Bufotenin is a chemical constituent in the secretions and eggs of several species of toads belonging to the genus Bufo, but the Colorado River toad (Incilius alvarius) is the only toad species in which bufotenin is present in large enough quantities for a psychoactive effect. Extracts of toad secretion, containing bufotenin and other bioactive compounds, have been used in some traditional medicines such as ch'an su (probably derived from Bufo gargarizans), which has been used medicinally for centuries in China, as an herbal remedy often illegally imported to the USA that can be prepared as a tea.

The toad was "recurrently depicted in Mesoamerican art", which some authors have interpreted as indicating that the effects of ingesting Bufo secretions have been known in Mesoamerica for many years; however, others doubt that this art provides sufficient ethnohistorical evidence to support the claim.

In addition to bufotenin, Bufo secretions also contain digoxin-like cardiac glycosides, and ingestion of the poison can be fatal. Ingestion of Bufo toad toxins and eggs by humans has resulted in several reported cases of poisoning, some of which resulted in death. The first reported death associated with the ingestion of ch'an su was that of a young woman who consumed it as a prescribed (by a Chinese herbalist) Chinese herbal remedy mixed into a tea (an approximately 100ml bowl). Immediately upon ingesting the ch'an tea, the woman experienced vomiting, difficulty breathing, and gastric tenderness, which spurred her husband to take her to the emergency room, where she died two and a half hours after drinking the tea.

Contemporary reports indicate that bufotenin-containing toad toxins have been used as a street drug; that is, as a supposed aphrodisiac, ingested orally in the form of ch'an su, and as a psychedelic, by smoking or orally ingesting Bufo toad secretion or dried Bufo skins. The use of chan'su and love stone (a related toad toxin preparation used as an aphrodisiac in the West Indies) has resulted in several cases of poisoning and at least one death. The practice of orally ingesting toad secretions has been referred to in popular culture and in the scientific literature as "toad licking" and has drawn media attention.

When vaporized or smoked, a single deep inhalation of the venom produces strong psychoactive effects within 15 seconds, which can last for up to 20 minutes. After inhalation, the user usually experiences a warm sensation, euphoria, and strong visual and auditory hallucinations, due to 5-MeO-DMT's high affinity for the 5-HT_{2} and 5-HT_{1A} serotonin receptor subtypes.

The 21st century phenomenon of smoking Colorado River toad venom can be traced to the publishing of the pamphlet Bufo Alvarius: the Psychedelic Toad of the Sonoran Desert in 1983, written under the pseudonym 'Albert Most.' The pamphlet describes how to extract and smoke the venom of the Colorado River toad, containing serotonergic psychedelic 5-MeO-DMT, and its publication sparked the present-day recreational use.

The author's true identity remained unknown until 2020, when journalist Hamilton Morris revealed that it was a man named Ken Nelson, from Denton, Texas. He interviewed Ken in S03 E01 of his show Hamilton's Pharmacopeia, Synthetic Toad Venom Machine, in December 2020.

Morris initially thought he had discovered the author in 2017. Writer Alfred Savinelli fraudulently claimed to be the author and was interviewed for his season 2 premiere, "The Psychedelic Toad". After the episode's airing, the real Albert Most, Ken Nelson, contacted Hamilton with verifiable proof that he wrote the pamphlet.

Among the notable people who have spoken publicly about their experiences with the psychoactive agents in the poison are boxer Mike Tyson, comedian Chelsea Handler, podcaster Joe Rogan, television personality Christina Haack, and motivational speaker Anthony Robbins.

On October 31, 2022 the United States National Park Service posted a warning on Facebook that people should not handle or lick the toad. Despite the warning's wide coverage in media, the post was made humorously and the Park Service has no records of people licking or otherwise harassing the toads in parks.

=== U.S. state laws ===
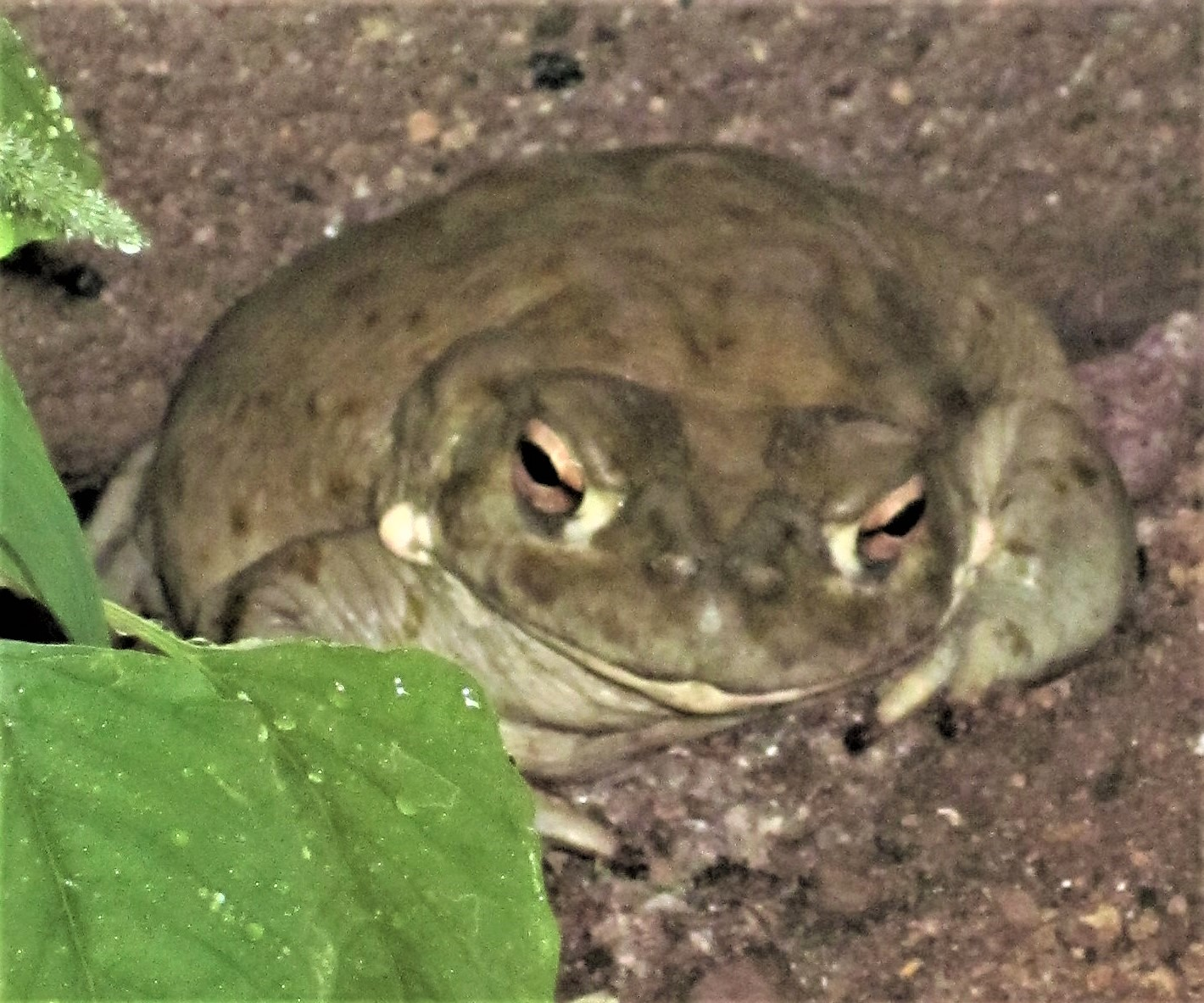
Toad at night in Tucson

A substance found among the toxins the toad excretes when it is threatened, 5-MeO-DMT, is often dried into crystals and smoked. It is considered illegal in the United States, and categorized as a Schedule 1 substance, though law enforcement is increasingly less likely to enforce the laws with its growing popularity.

The toads received national attention in 1994 after The New York Times Magazine published an article about a California teacher who became the first person to be arrested for possessing secretions of the toads. Bufotenin had been outlawed in California since 1970.

In November 2007, a man in Kansas City, Missouri, was discovered with an I. alvarius toad in his possession, and charged with possession of a controlled substance after they determined he intended to use its secretions for recreational purposes. In Arizona, one may legally bag up to 10 toads with a fishing license, but it could constitute a criminal violation if it can be shown that one is in possession of this toad with the intent to smoke its secretions.

None of the U.S. states in which I. alvarius is or was indigenous – California, Arizona, and New Mexico – legally allows a person to remove the toad from the state. For example, the Arizona Game and Fish Department is clear about the law in Arizona: "An individual shall not...export any live wildlife from the state; 3. Transport, possess, offer for sale, sell, sell as live bait, trade, give away, purchase, rent, lease, display, exhibit, propagate...within the state."

=== Threatened species ===
Due to the rising popularity in collecting this toad, compounded with other threats such as motorists running over them, and predators such as raccoons eating them, U.S. states such as New Mexico and California have listed them as "threatened;" collecting I. alvarius is unlawful in those states. Collecting these toads is thought to cause stress to them, in particular during the process of "milking" where collectors rub the toads under the chin to cause it to secrete the poison in the form of a milky substance that is then scraped from the body of the toad. Robert Villa, who serves as president of the Tucson Herpetological Society, said in a 2022 New York Times interview, "There's a perception of abundance, but when you begin to remove large numbers of a species, their numbers are going to collapse like a house of cards at some point."

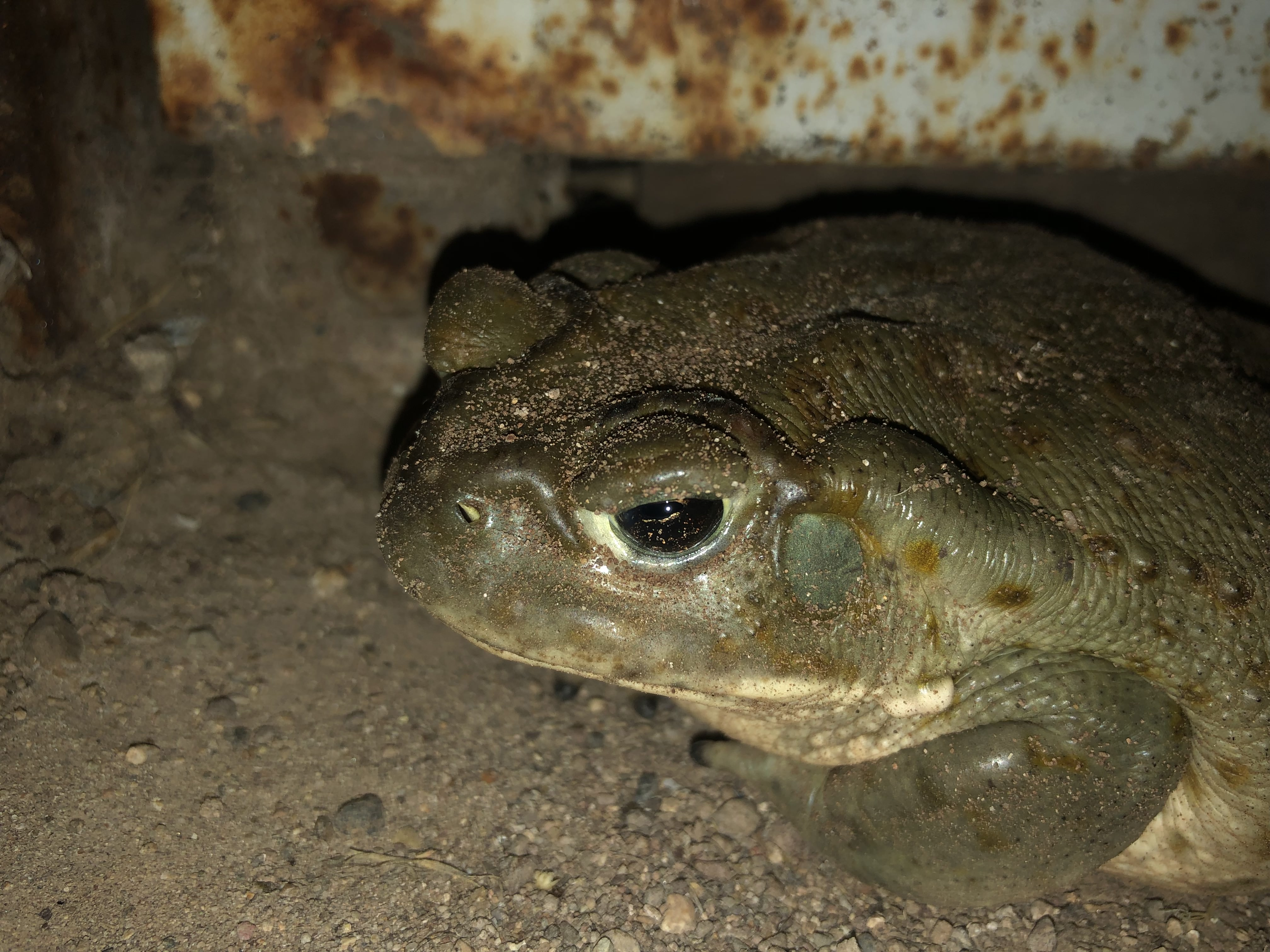
Sonoran desert toad close-up

Efforts to breed the toads in large quantities to offset their losses in the wild are criticized as potentially attracting predators to these areas, and creating a disease vector for pathogens such as chytrid fungus, which can then spread to devastate more of them in the wild. Synthetic forms of the drug that collectors seek in the toad poison are fairly easy to produce and may offset overcollection.

In June 2025, a study showed that persistent trapping of the toads in Mexico has decimated several populations, putting the species at risk of extinction.

== Controversies ==
The contemporary “toad medicine” scene has drawn criticism over unverified therapeutic claims, safety practices, and conservation impacts. Mexican physician Octavio Rettig Hinojosa has been a prominent promoter of smoking dried secretions from Incilius alvarius, presenting the practice as a rediscovered Indigenous ritual and as a treatment for addiction among the Comcaac (Seri). However, fieldwork reported by Horák et al. documents fatal incidents during ceremonies (including drownings in rivers and cenotes and deaths among elderly participants with cardiac complications) and notes that, despite publicized “rehabilitation” efforts, many Seri individuals “continued using” methamphetamine—at times reportedly mixing methamphetamine pipes with toad secretion—based on 2017 eyewitness and community testimony cited by the authors.

Safety concerns have also featured in court proceedings. In Spain, the July 2019 death of photographer José Luis Abad during a “toad” ceremony led to the arrest of actor Nacho Vidal and others on suspicion of involuntary manslaughter; the case was provisionally archived in May 2023 but later revived, and as of October 2025 the Valencia prosecutor is seeking a four-year prison sentence related to the alleged negligent management of the rite and delayed medical assistance. Investigative reporting has also attributed several deaths worldwide to ceremonies linked to Rettig, while emphasizing the lack of clinical oversight and the variability of underground practices.

== See also ==
- 5-MeO-DMT
