= Virola carinata =

Conservation status
- Least Concern (IUCN 3.1)

Scientific classification
- Kingdom: Plantae
- Clade: Embryophytes
- Clade: Tracheophytes
- Clade: Spermatophytes
- Clade: Angiosperms
- Clade: Magnoliids
- Order: Magnoliales
- Family: Myristicaceae
- Genus: Virola
- Species: V. carinata

Binomial name
- Virola carinata (Spruce ex Benth.) Warb.

Synonyms
- Myristica carinata Spruce ex Benth.; Palala carinata (Spruce ex Benth.) Kuntze; Virola venosa var. martii Warb.

Species of tree

Virola carinata is a New World, tropical evergreen tree in the family Myristicaceae. It is native to Bolivia, northern and west-central Brazil, Colombia, Peru, and Venezuela. It grows to a height of about 30m and its fruit is subglobular, 16–20 mm long and 17–19 mm in diameter, found in groups of 4 to 12.

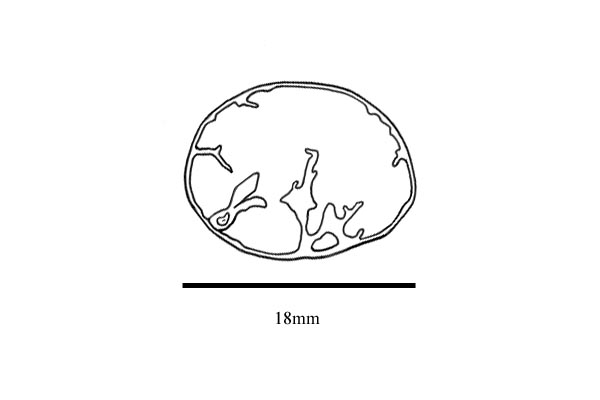
Embryo of V. carinata

== See also ==
- Psychedelic plants
