= Virola divergens =

Scientific classification
- Kingdom: Plantae
- Clade: Tracheophytes
- Clade: Angiosperms
- Clade: Magnoliids
- Order: Magnoliales
- Family: Myristicaceae
- Genus: Virola
- Species: V. divergens

Binomial name
- Virola divergens Ducke

Species of tree

Virola divergens is a species of tree in the family Myristicaceae. It grows to about 25m tall. The fruits are ellipsoidal and subglobular, 18–38 mm long and 16–33 mm in diameter, grouped 4 to 8.

== Distribution ==
Virola divergens' native range is SE. Colombia to Peru and N. Brazil. It grows at altitudes of 100–240 metres.

== See also ==
- Psychedelic plants
