= Eusiderin =

Chemical compound found in certain plant genera

- Chemical structure of eusiderin

Names
- Preferred IUPAC name (2R,3R)-5-Methoxy-3-methyl-7-(prop-2-en-1-yl)-2-(3,4,5-trimethoxyphenyl)-2,3-dihydro-1,4-benzodioxine

Identifiers
CAS Number	127420-50-2 =
3D model (JSmol)	Interactive image
ChemSpider	9569958
PubChem CID	11395057
CompTox Dashboard (EPA)	DTXSID90464591
- InChI: InChI=1S/C22H26O6/c1-7-8-14-9-16(23-3)22-19(10-14)28-20(13(2)27-22)15-11-17(24-4)21(26-6)18(12-15)25-5/h7,9-13,20H,1,8H2,2-6H3/t13-,20+/m1/s1 Key: BVNKWNRETUIZFZ-XCLFUZPHSA-N; InChI=1/C22H26O6/c1-7-8-14-9-16(23-3)22-19(10-14)28-20(13(2)27-22)15-11-17(24-4)21(26-6)18(12-15)25-5/h7,9-13,20H,1,8H2,2-6H3/t13-,20+/m1/s1 Key: BVNKWNRETUIZFZ-XCLFUZPHBF
- SMILES: O1c3c(O[C@@H]([C@H]1c2cc(OC)c(OC)c(OC)c2)C)c(OC)cc(c3)C\C=C

Properties
Chemical formula	C_{22}H_{26}O_{6}
Molar mass	386.42 g/mol
- Except where otherwise noted, data are given for materials in their standard state (at 25 °C [77 °F], 100 kPa). verify (what is ?) Infobox references

Eusiderin is a neolignan found in Virola sp and Aniba sp.
