= NB-5-MeO-DALT =

Clinical data
- Other names: NBoc-5-MeO-DALT; 5-MeO-DALT BOC; N1-tert-Butoxycarbonyl-5-methoxy-N,N-diallyltryptamine
- Drug class: Serotonergic psychedelic; Hallucinogen
- ATC code: None

Identifiers
- IUPAC name: tert-butyl 3-{2-[di(prop-2-en-1-yl)amino]ethyl}-5-methoxy-1H-indole-1-carboxylate

Chemical and physical data
- Formula: C_{22}H_{30}N_{2}O_{3}
- Molar mass: 370.493 g·mol^{−1}
- 3D model (JSmol): Interactive image
- SMILES: C=CCN(CCc1cn(c2c1cc(OC)cc2)C(=O)OC(C)(C)C)CC=C
- InChI: InChI=1S/C22H30N2O3/c1-7-12-23(13-8-2)14-11-17-16-24(21(25)27-22(3,4)5)20-10-9-18(26-6)15-19(17)20/h7-10,15-16H,1-2,11-14H2,3-6H3; Key:XPSXYYVNTCFKCO-UHFFFAOYSA-N

NB-5-MeO-DALT, also known as 5-MeO-DALT BOC or as N1-tert-butoxycarbonyl-5-methoxy-N,N-diallyltryptamine, is a psychedelic drug of the tryptamine and 5-methoxytryptamine families related to 5-MeO-DALT. It is the N′-tert-butyloxycarbonyl (NBoc) derivative of 5-MeO-DALT. The drug is thought to be a prodrug of 5-MeO-DALT when subjected to sufficient heat, for instance when smoking. NB-5-MeO-DALT was encountered as a novel designer drug being sold online in August 2022.

== See also ==
- Substituted tryptamine
- NBoc-DMT (NB-DMT)
- NB-5-MeO-MiPT
- N-t-BOC-MDMA
