= Virola multinervia =

Conservation status
- Least Concern (IUCN 3.1)

Scientific classification
- Kingdom: Plantae
- Clade: Embryophytes
- Clade: Tracheophytes
- Clade: Spermatophytes
- Clade: Angiosperms
- Clade: Magnoliids
- Order: Magnoliales
- Family: Myristicaceae
- Genus: Virola
- Species: V. multinervia

Binomial name
- Virola multinervia Ducke (1936)

Species of tree

Virola multinervia is a species of tree in the family Myristicaceae. It is found in Colombia, Peru, Ecuador, Venezuela and Brazil (Amazonas, Pará). It grows to a height of about 35m. The fruit is ellipsoidal to ovoidal, 26–40 mm long, 19–32 mm in diameter, and is found in groups of 1 to 7.

== See also ==
- Psychedelic plants
