= NB-5-MeO-MiPT =

Clinical data
- Other names: NBoc-5-MeO-MiPT; 5-MeO-MiPT BOC; N1-tert-Butoxycarbonyl-5-methoxy-N-methyl-N-isopropyltryptamine
- Drug class: Serotonergic psychedelic; Hallucinogen
- ATC code: None

Identifiers
- IUPAC name: tert-butyl 5-methoxy-3-{2-[methyl(propan-2-yl)amino]ethyl}-1H-indole-1-carboxylate

Chemical and physical data
- Formula: C_{20}H_{30}N_{2}O_{3}
- Molar mass: 346.471 g·mol^{−1}
- 3D model (JSmol): Interactive image
- SMILES: COc1ccc2c(c1)c(CCN(C(C)C)C)cn2C(=O)OC(C)(C)C
- InChI: InChI=1S/C20H30N2O3/c1-14(2)21(6)11-10-15-13-22(19(23)25-20(3,4)5)18-9-8-16(24-7)12-17(15)18/h8-9,12-14H,10-11H2,1-7H3; Key:AMZWBTWBKOGMQS-UHFFFAOYSA-N

NB-5-MeO-MiPT, also known as 5-MeO-MiPT BOC or as N1-tert-butoxycarbonyl-5-methoxy-N-methyl-N-isopropyltryptamine, is a psychedelic drug of the tryptamine and 5-methoxytryptamine families related to 5-MeO-MiPT. It is the N′-tert-butyloxycarbonyl (NBoc) derivative of 5-MeO-MiPT. The drug is thought to be a prodrug of 5-MeO-MiPT when subjected to sufficient heat, for instance when smoking. NB-5-MeO-MiPT was encountered as a novel designer drug being sold online in August 2022.

== See also ==
- Substituted tryptamine
- NBoc-DMT (NB-DMT)
- NB-5-MeO-DALT
- N-t-BOC-MDMA
