= NBoc-DMT =

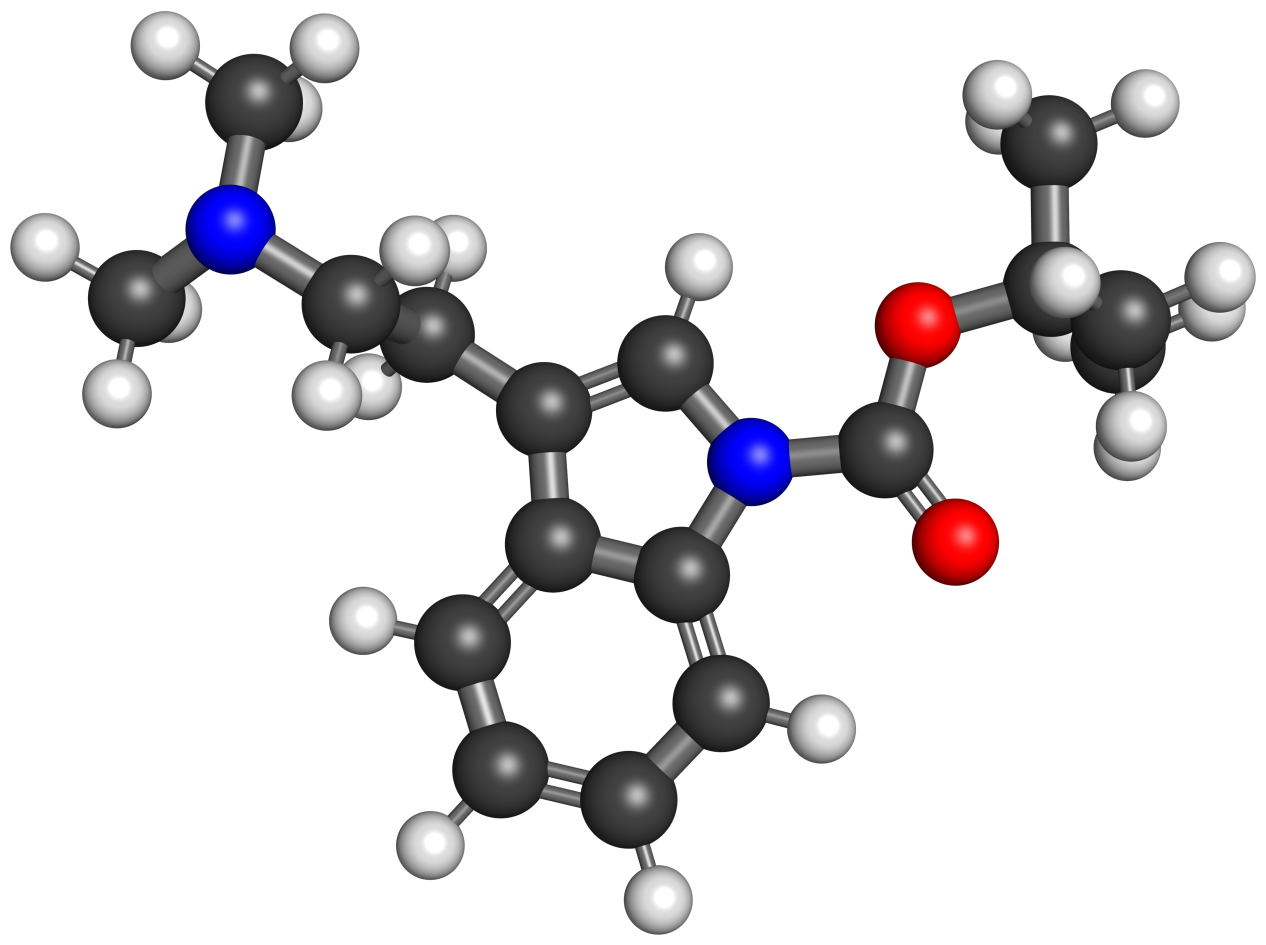

Clinical data
- Other names: NB-DMT; DMT-BOC; N′-t-BOC-DMT; N′-tert-BOC-DMT; tert-BOC-DMT; N′-tert-Butoxycarbonyl-N,N-dimethyltryptamine
- Drug class: Serotonergic psychedelic; Hallucinogen; Serotonin receptor agonist; Serotonin 5-HT_{2A} receptor agonist

Legal status
- Legal status: Illegal in Russia

Identifiers
- IUPAC name: tert-butyl 3-[2-(dimethylamino)ethyl]-1H-indole-1-carboxylate
- CAS Number: 2210243-51-7
- PubChem CID: 141803940

Chemical and physical data
- Formula: C_{17}H_{24}N_{2}O_{2}
- Molar mass: 288.391 g·mol^{−1}
- 3D model (JSmol): Interactive image
- SMILES: CC(C)(C)OC(=O)N1C=C(C2=CC=CC=C21)CCN(C)C
- InChI: InChI=1S/C17H24N2O2/c1-17(2,3)21-16(20)19-12-13(10-11-18(4)5)14-8-6-7-9-15(14)19/h6-9,12H,10-11H2,1-5H3; Key:IKVMWFRRDDILJA-UHFFFAOYSA-N

NBoc-DMT, or NB-DMT, also known as N^{1}-tert-butoxycarbonyl-N,N-dimethyltryptamine, is a serotonergic psychedelic of the tryptamine family. It is a novel designer and recreational drug and is a synthetic modification of dimethyltryptamine (DMT) with an N′-tert-butyloxycarbonyl (NBoc) group.

NB-DMT is said to be a "prodrug" of DMT that decomposes into DMT when the compound is heated (e.g., with smoking or vaping). It may also be useful as an orally active prodrug of DMT, unlike DMT itself which is inactive when taken orally. NB-DMT has been claimed to have about 25% of the potency of DMT by weight. It was first detected as a designer drug being sold online by February 2024.

NB-DMT is a Schedule I controlled substance in Russia. The drug is not an explicitly controlled substance in the United States or in Canada. A number of other NBoc designer drugs have also been encountered.

== See also ==
- Substituted tryptamine
- NB-5-MeO-MiPT
- NB-5-MeO-DALT
- N-t-BOC-MDMA
- 1-Benzoyl-DMT
- N-Phosphonooxymethyl-DMT (N-POM-DMT)
