= Virola venosa =

Conservation status
- Least Concern (IUCN 3.1)

Scientific classification
- Kingdom: Plantae
- Clade: Embryophytes
- Clade: Tracheophytes
- Clade: Spermatophytes
- Clade: Angiosperms
- Clade: Magnoliids
- Order: Magnoliales
- Family: Myristicaceae
- Genus: Virola
- Species: V. venosa

Binomial name
- Virola venosa (Benth.) Warb.

Synonyms
- Myristica venosa Benth. (1853); Myristica venosa var. poeppigii A.DC.; Palala venosa (Benth.) Kuntze; Virola venosa var. poeppigii (A.DC.) E.F.Warb.

Species of tree

Virola venosa is a species of tree in the family Myristicaceae. It is native to Colombia, Venezuela, Suriname, and northern and west-central Brazil (including Amapá, Amazonas, Pará and Rondônia). It grows 5–30 m (16–98 ft) tall.

The fruits are ellipsoidal to subglobular, 19–22 mm (0.75–0.87 in) long and 16–18 mm (0.63–0.71 in) in diameter.
