= Virola peruviana =

Conservation status
- Least Concern (IUCN 3.1)

Scientific classification
- Kingdom: Plantae
- Clade: Embryophytes
- Clade: Tracheophytes
- Clade: Spermatophytes
- Clade: Angiosperms
- Clade: Magnoliids
- Order: Magnoliales
- Family: Myristicaceae
- Genus: Virola
- Species: V. peruviana

Binomial name
- Virola peruviana (A.DC.) Warb.

Synonyms
- Myristica peruviana A.DC. (1855); Palala peruviana (A.DC.) Kuntze

Species of tree

Virola peruviana is a species of tree in the family Myristicaceae. It is found in northern Brazil (Amazonas and Pará), Bolivia, Colombia, Ecuador, and Peru. It grows to a height of about 35 m (100 ft). The fruit is ellipsoidal, 14–24 mm long and 11–23 mm in diameter, forming groups of about 5 to 15.

== See also ==
- Psychedelic plants
