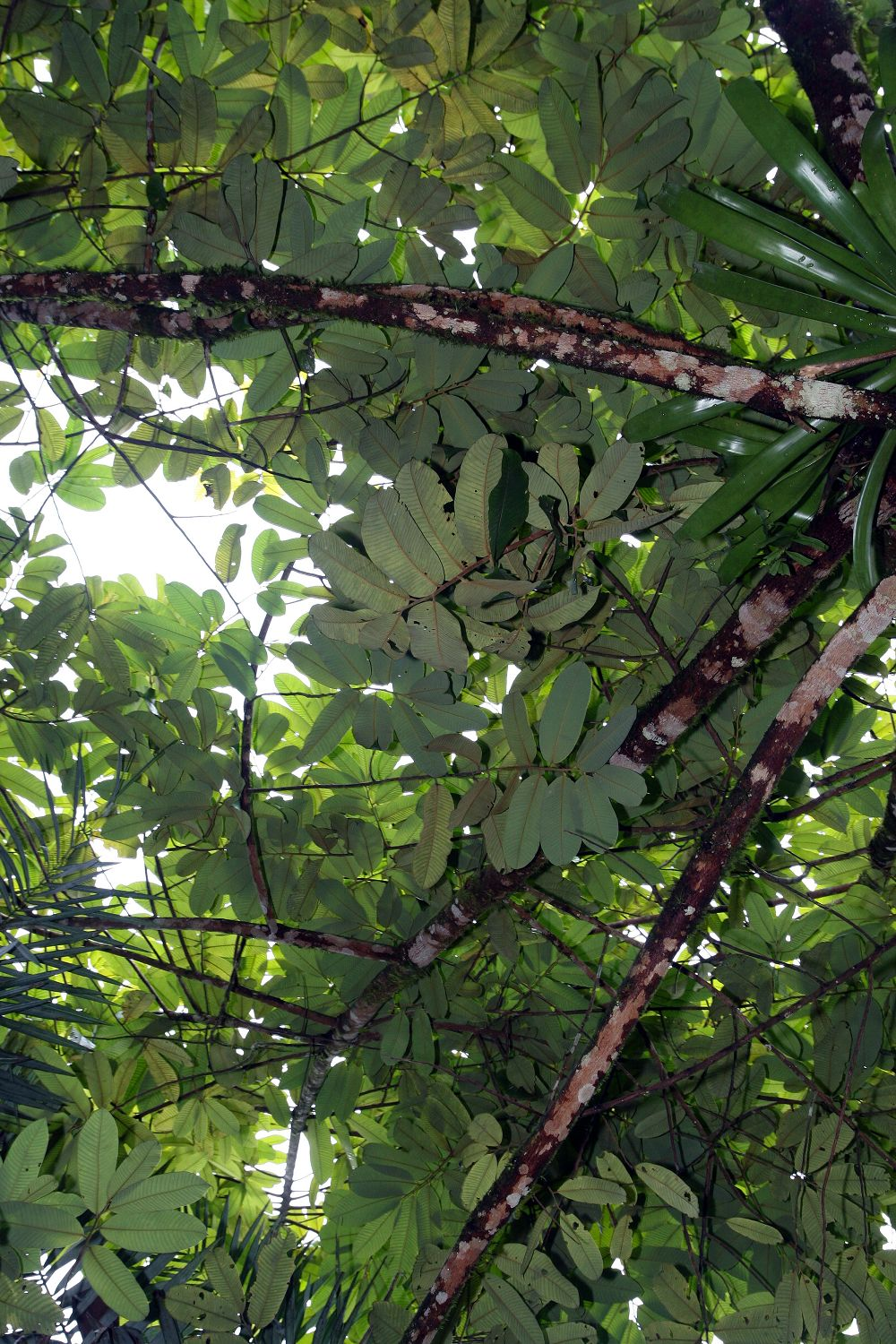
- Canopy of Virola koschnyi

Scientific classification
- Kingdom: Plantae
- Clade: Tracheophytes
- Clade: Angiosperms
- Clade: Magnoliids
- Order: Magnoliales
- Family: Myristicaceae
- Genus: Virola; Aubl. (1775)

Species
- 71; see text

= Virola =

Genus of plants

Virola is a genus of flowering plants in the nutmeg family, Myristicaceae. It includes medium-sized trees native to rainforests of the tropical Americas, ranging from southern Mexico to Bolivia and southern Brazil. Species are known commonly as epená, patricá, or cumala. They have glossy, dark green leaves and clusters of tiny yellow flowers, and may emit a pungent odor.

== Traditional use ==
Several species of this genus have been used to create hallucinogenic snuff powders.

== Chemical constituents ==
The tops of Virola oleifera have been shown to produce lignan-7-ols and verrucosin that have antifungal action regarding Cladosporium sphaerospermum in doses as low as 25 micrograms. Lignan-7-ols oleiferin-B and oleiferin-G worked for Cladosporium cladosporioides starting as low as 10 micrograms.

== Species ==
71 species are accepted.

- Virola aequatorialis Muriel & Balslev
- Virola aguarunana D.Santam.
- Virola albidiflora Ducke
- Virola allenii D.Santam. & Aguilar
- Virola alvaroperezii D.Santam.
- Virola amistadensis D.Santam.
- Virola bicuhyba (Schott) Warb.
- Virola bombuscaroensis D.Santam.
- Virola caducifolia W.A.Rodrigues
- Virola calimensis D.Santam.
- Virola calophylla (Spruce) Warb.
- Virola calophylloidea Markgr.
- Virola carinata (Spruce ex Benth.) Warb.
- Virola chrysocarpa D.Santam. & Aguilar
- Virola coelhoi W.A.Rodrigues
- Virola cogolloi D.Santam.
- Virola crebrinervia Ducke
- Virola cumala D.Santam.
- Virola cuspidata (Benth.) Warb.
- Virola decorticans Ducke
- Virola divergens Ducke
- Virola dixonii Little
- Virola duckei A.C.Sm.
- Virola elongata (Benth.) Warb.
- Virola flexuosa A.C.Sm.
- Virola fosteri D.Santam.
- Virola gardneri (A.DC.) Warb.
- Virola guatemalensis (Hemsl.) Warb.
- Virola guggenheimii W.A.Rodrigues
- Virola koschnyi Warb.
- Virola kwatae Sabatier
- Virola laevigata Standl.
- Virola lieneana Paula & E.P.Heringer
- Virola loretensis A.C.Sm.
- Virola macrocarpa A.C.Sm.
- Virola malmei A.C.Sm.
- Virola marleneae W.A.Rodrigues
- Virola megacarpa A.H.Gentry
- Virola michelii Heckel
- Virola micrantha A.C.Sm.
- Virola minutiflora Ducke
- Virola mollissima (Poepp. ex A.DC.) Warb.
- Virola montana D.Santam.
- Virola multicostata Ducke
- Virola multiflora (Standl.) A.C.Sm.
- Virola multinervia Ducke
- Virola nobilis A.C.Sm.
- Virola obovata Ducke
- Virola officinalis Warb.
- Virola otobifolia D.Santam.
- Virola parkeri D.Santam. & Lagom.
- Virola parvifolia Ducke
- Virola pavonis (A.DC.) A.C.Sm.
- Virola peruviana (A.DC.) Warb.
- Virola polyneura W.A.Rodrigues
- Virola reidii Little
- Virola rugulosa (Spruce) Warb.
- Virola sanguinea D.Santam.
- Virola schultesii A.C.Sm.
- Virola sebifera Aubl.
- Virola sessilis (A.DC.) Warb.
- Virola steyermarkii W.A.Rodrigues
- Virola subsessilis (Benth.) Warb.
- Virola surinamensis (Rol. ex Rottb.) Warb.
- Virola theiodora (Spruce ex Benth.) Warb. (synonym Virola rufula Warb.)
- Virola tuckerae D.Santam. & Lagom.
- Virola urbaniana Warb.
- Virola venosa (Benth.) Warb.
- Virola villosa (Benth.) Warb.
- Virola weberbaueri Markgr.
- Virola yasuniana D.Santam.

== Gallery ==
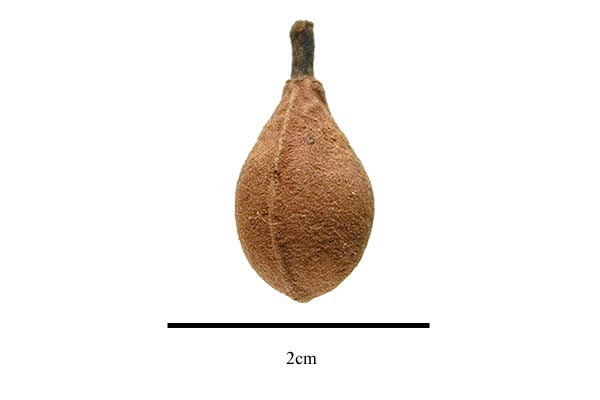
Virola elongata fruit

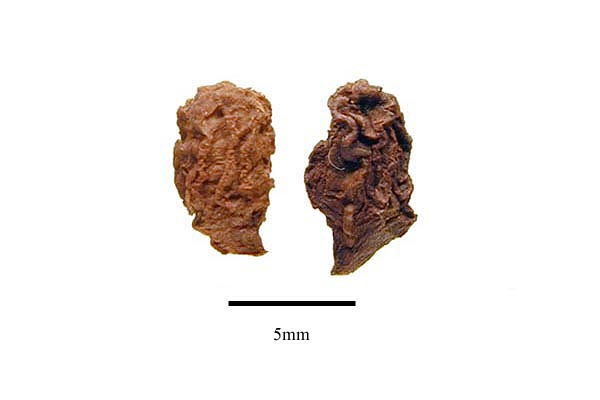
Virola elongata seeds

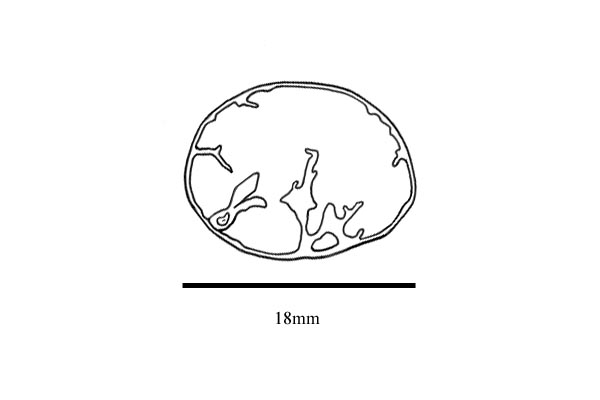
Virola carinata embryo

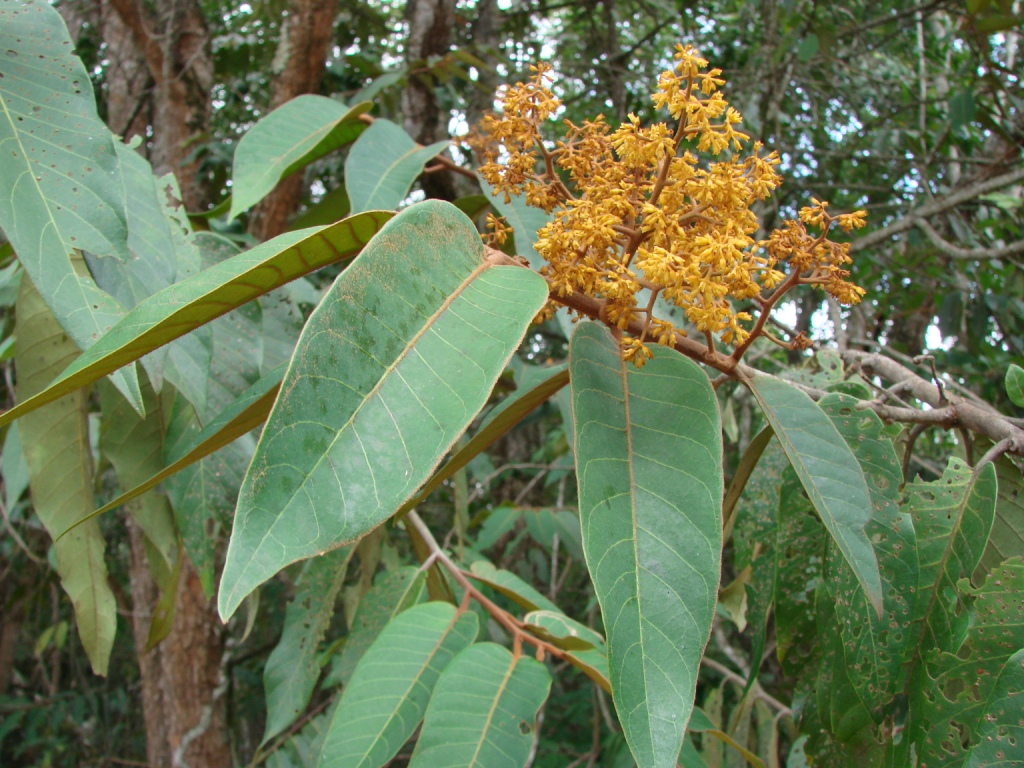
Virola sebifera

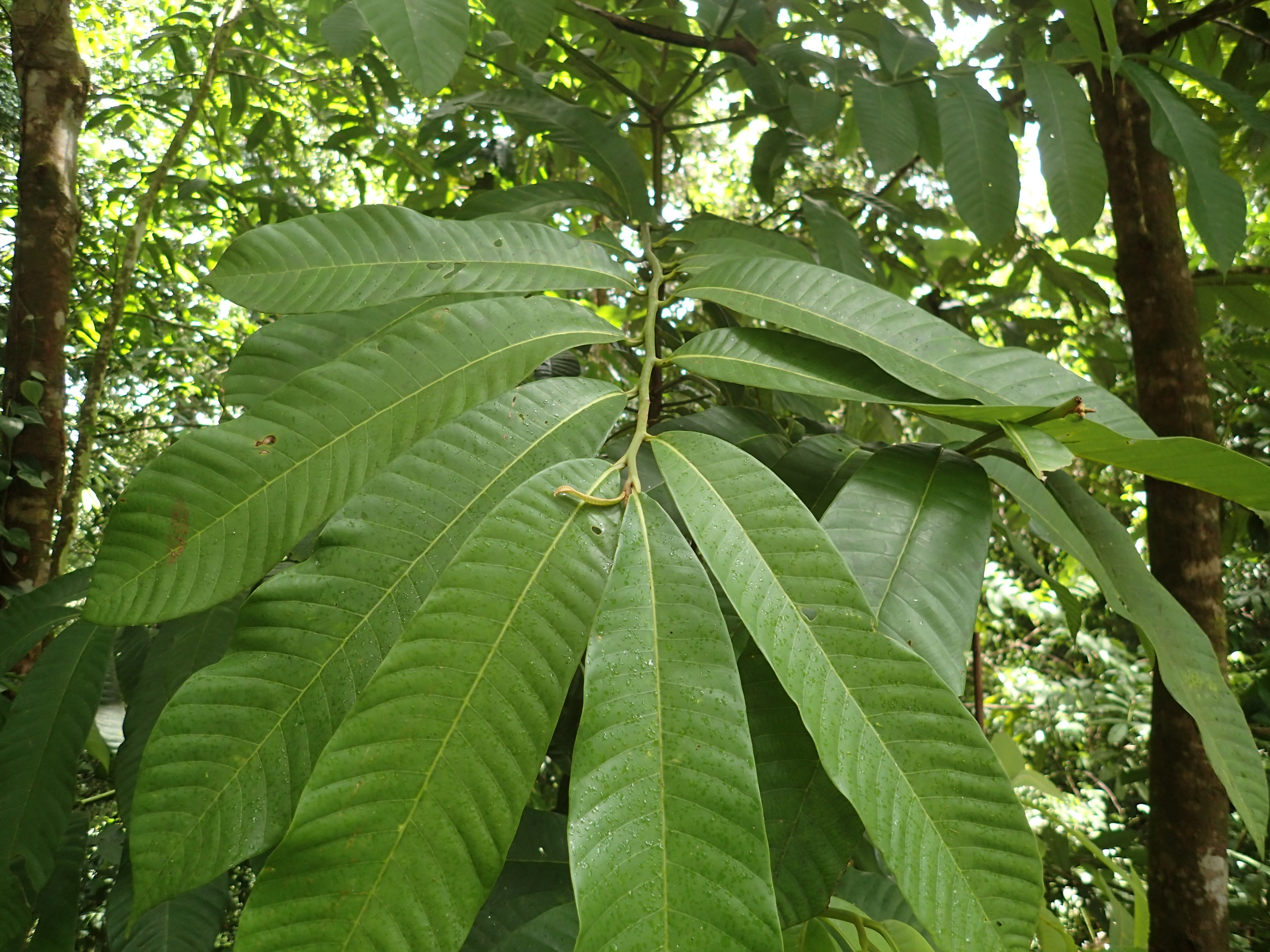
Virola surinamensis

== Legal status ==
=== United States ===
==== Louisiana ====
Except for ornamental purposes, growing, selling or possessing Virola spp. is prohibited by Louisiana State Act 159.

== See also ==
- Myristica — some species of this genus have been reclassified into Virola.
- Ayahuasca
- Entheogen
- Psychedelic plants
