= 2-Methyltryptoline =

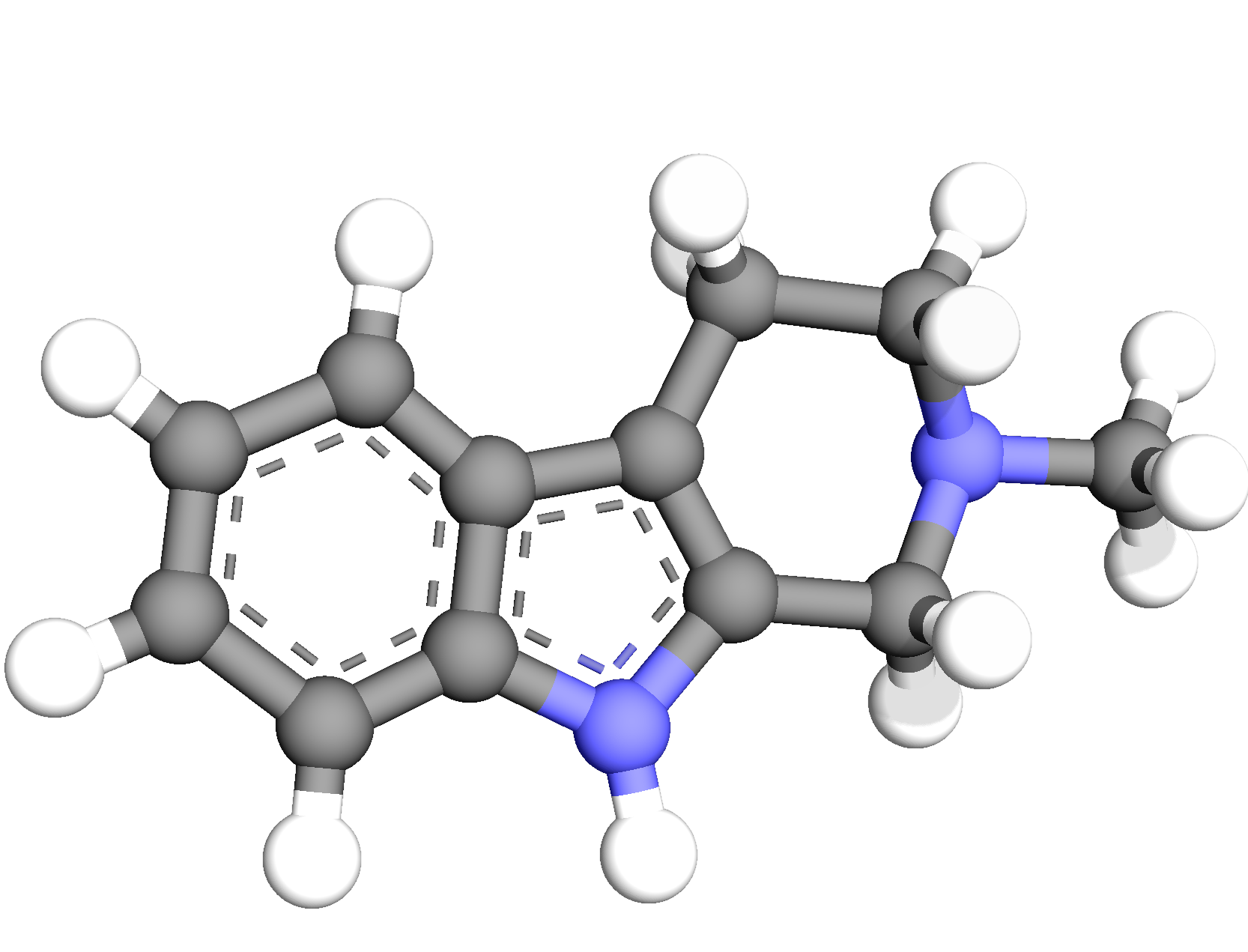

Names
- IUPAC name 2-methyl-1,3,4,9-tetrahydropyrido[3,4-b]indole
- Other names 2-Methyl-1,2,3,4-tetrahydro-β-carboline; 2-Me-THβC

Identifiers
CAS Number	13100-00-0
3D model (JSmol)	Interactive image
ChEBI	CHEBI:185749
ChEMBL	ChEMBL69618
ChemSpider	108744
ECHA InfoCard	100.440.994
PubChem CID	121896
CompTox Dashboard (EPA)	DTXSID40156838
- InChI: InChI=1S/C12H14N2/c1-14-7-6-10-9-4-2-3-5-11(9)13-12(10)8-14/h2-5,13H,6-8H2,1H3 Key: JOFKCNJIUXPJAC-UHFFFAOYSA-N
- SMILES: CN1CCC2=C(C1)NC3=CC=CC=C23

Properties
Chemical formula	C_{12}H_{14}N_{2}
Molar mass	186.258 g·mol^{−1}
- Except where otherwise noted, data are given for materials in their standard state (at 25 °C [77 °F], 100 kPa). Infobox references

2-Methyltryptoline, also known as 2-methyl-1,2,3,4-tetrahydro-β-carboline (2-Me-THβC), is a natural product, closely related to tryptoline. An indole alkaloid of the substituted β-carboline family, 2-methyltryptoline is found in the drink ayahuasca, where it was isolated from Psychotria viridis and Psychotria carthagenensis. 2-Methyltryptoline is also found in some cereal and Papaveraceae plants.

== Pharmacology ==
=== Pharmacodynamics ===
Little is known about the psychoactivity of 2-methyltryptoline; however, it is known to be a potent protoxin and, accordingly, a neurotoxin that acts similarly to MPTP (although it does not cause idiopathic Parkinson's disease) and it is assumed that it is an endogenous substance, in the long term it is a monoaminergic neurotoxin.

2-Methyltryptoline is a reversible inhibitor of monoamine oxidase.

=== Metabolism ===
2-Methyltryptoline to neurotoxic β-carbolinium cations is carried out by heme-containing peroxidases (MPO, LPO), MAO (MAO-A or MAO-B, but they did not form active metabolites) and CYP2D6 which formed polar metabolites (hydroxylation at positions 6 and 7), which, judging by their nature, can be considered as detoxification metabolites.

== Natural occurrence ==
2-Methyltryptoline has been found in Psychotria viridis, Psychotria carthagenensis, Anadenanthera peregrina, Anadenanthera colubrina, in cereal plants such as Arundo donax, Phalaris arundinacea, Phalaris aquatica, Phalaris coerulescens, in Papaveraceae as Papaver rhoeas, in Solanaceae such as Solanum jabrense, in some Elaeagnaceae, such as Elaeagnus angustifolia and has been imprinted in Cyathobasis fruticulosa.

== See also ==
- Substituted β-carboline
