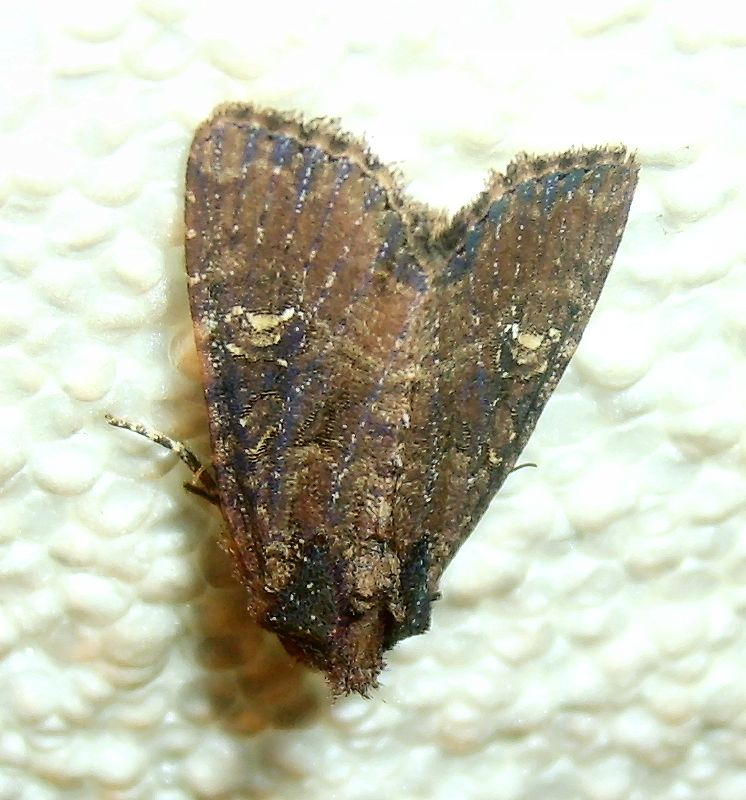

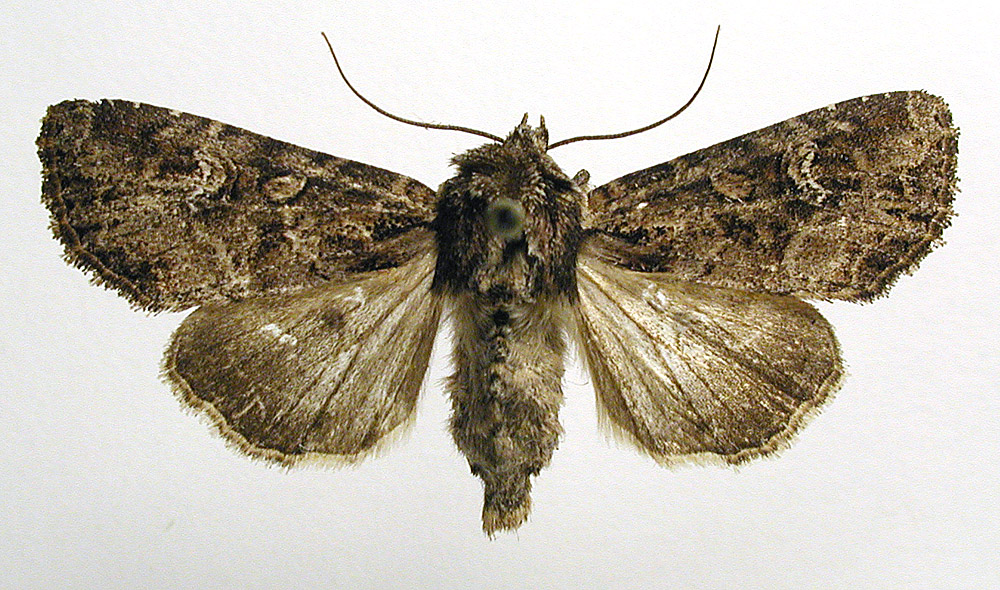

Scientific classification
- Kingdom: Animalia
- Phylum: Arthropoda
- Clade: Pancrustacea
- Class: Insecta
- Order: Lepidoptera
- Superfamily: Noctuoidea
- Family: Noctuidae
- Genus: Apamea
- Species: A. unanimis

Binomial name
- Apamea unanimis (Hübner, 1813)

Synonyms
- Noctua unanimis

= Apamea unanimis =

Small clouded brindle

Species of moth

Apamea unanimis, the small clouded brindle, is a moth of the family Noctuidae. The species was first described by Jacob Hübner in 1813. It is native to Europe, Turkey, Azerbaijan, and western Siberia. It has been introduced in North America and can now be found in Ontario, Quebec, New Brunswick, New York, Michigan, and Wisconsin.

The wingspan is 30–38 mm. Its forewings are brownish fuscous, or, like obscura Haw., red brown, but without so much of the grey tinge; a black streak from base below cell, and another above inner margin near base; (these though well marked in its aberrations submissa and remissa are not visible in typical obscura); often a blackish streak on submedian fold between the two lines; reniform stigma externally edged with white; the terminal area not so dark, more dusted with grey; the submarginal line not acutely angled below middle; — the form with black streak on submedian fold, sometimes with a paler basal and submarginal areas, as in remissa Hbn, is the ab. secalina Haw.; — ab. rufithorax ab. nov. [Warren], agreeing in both respects with secalina, has besides the whole head and thorax including the patagia bright rufous; the only example, a male, of this form is from Wiesbaden; — two other forms deserve notice; ab. fasciata ab. nov. has the median area filled up with dark fuscous, the pale upper stigmata and the inner and outer lines more conspicuous; the head and thorax blackish; — ab. semiochrea ab. nov. [Warren] has the postmedian area between outer and submarginal lines and the lower part of the median area pale ochreous, and might easily be mistaken for an example of secalis L. ab. oculea Guen. Larvae are reddish clay-yellow to yellow-brown with yellow-white dorsal and dorsolateral lines as well as a bright side stripe from which the black spiracles stand out. The head capsule, neck shield and anus shield are brownish.

Adults are on wing from June to July depending on the location.

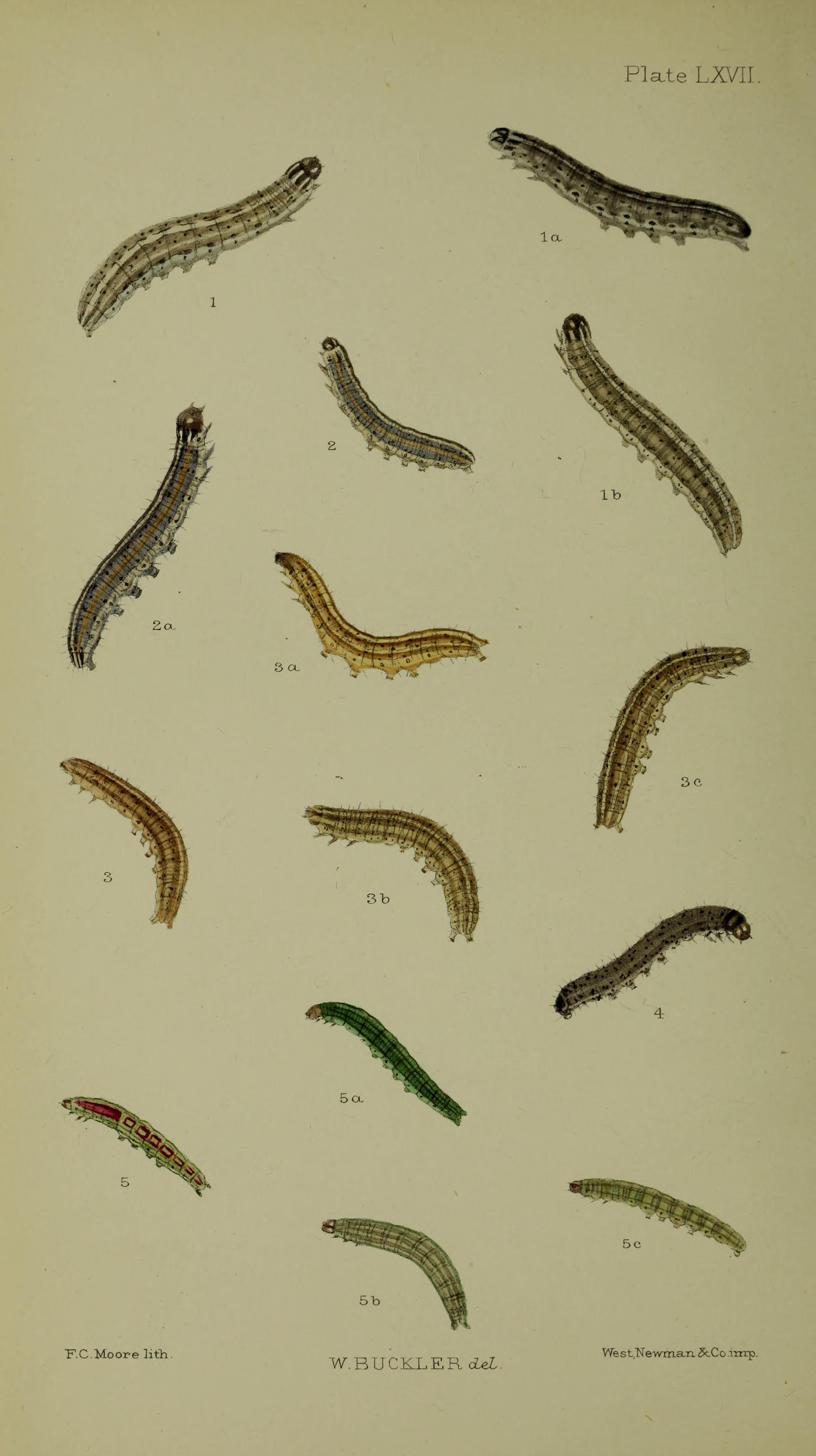
Figs 3, 3a,3b,3c larva after last moult

The larvae feed on the common reed, canarygrasses, and mannagrasses. .
