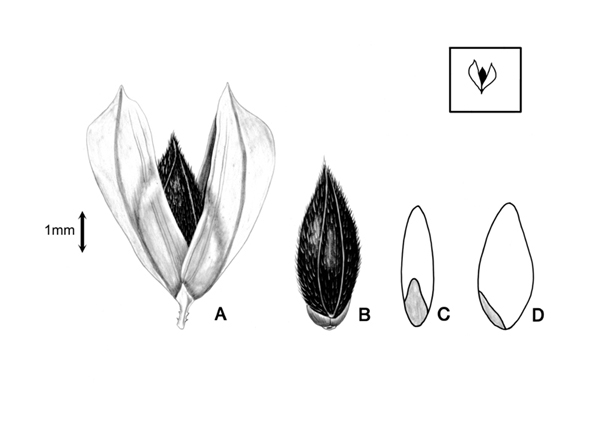

Scientific classification
- Kingdom: Plantae
- Clade: Tracheophytes
- Clade: Angiosperms
- Clade: Monocots
- Clade: Commelinids
- Order: Poales
- Family: Poaceae
- Subfamily: Pooideae
- Genus: Phalaris
- Species: P. brachystachys

Binomial name
- Phalaris brachystachys Link

= Phalaris brachystachys =

Species of grass

Phalaris brachystachys, the confused canary-grass or shortspike canarygrass, is an annual grass with growth habits and cultural requirements similar to Phalaris aquatica. It is native to the Mediterranean region. It grows most actively during the spring and fall, while resting during the heat of midsummer and the short cool days of winter. It also must be protected from heavy freezes.

Some Phalaris species contain gramine, which can cause brain damage, other organ damage, central nervous system damage and death in sheep.

While at least one strain showed an extremely strong occurrence of N,N-DMT as the sole alkaloid, other strains indicated the presence of 5-MeO-DMT as well. Strongly positive human bioassays have been reported using some clones.
