= C15H17N3 =

The molecular formula C_{15}H_{17}N_{3} (molar mass: 239.322 g/mol) may refer to:

- Ditolylguanidine
- BMS-505130
