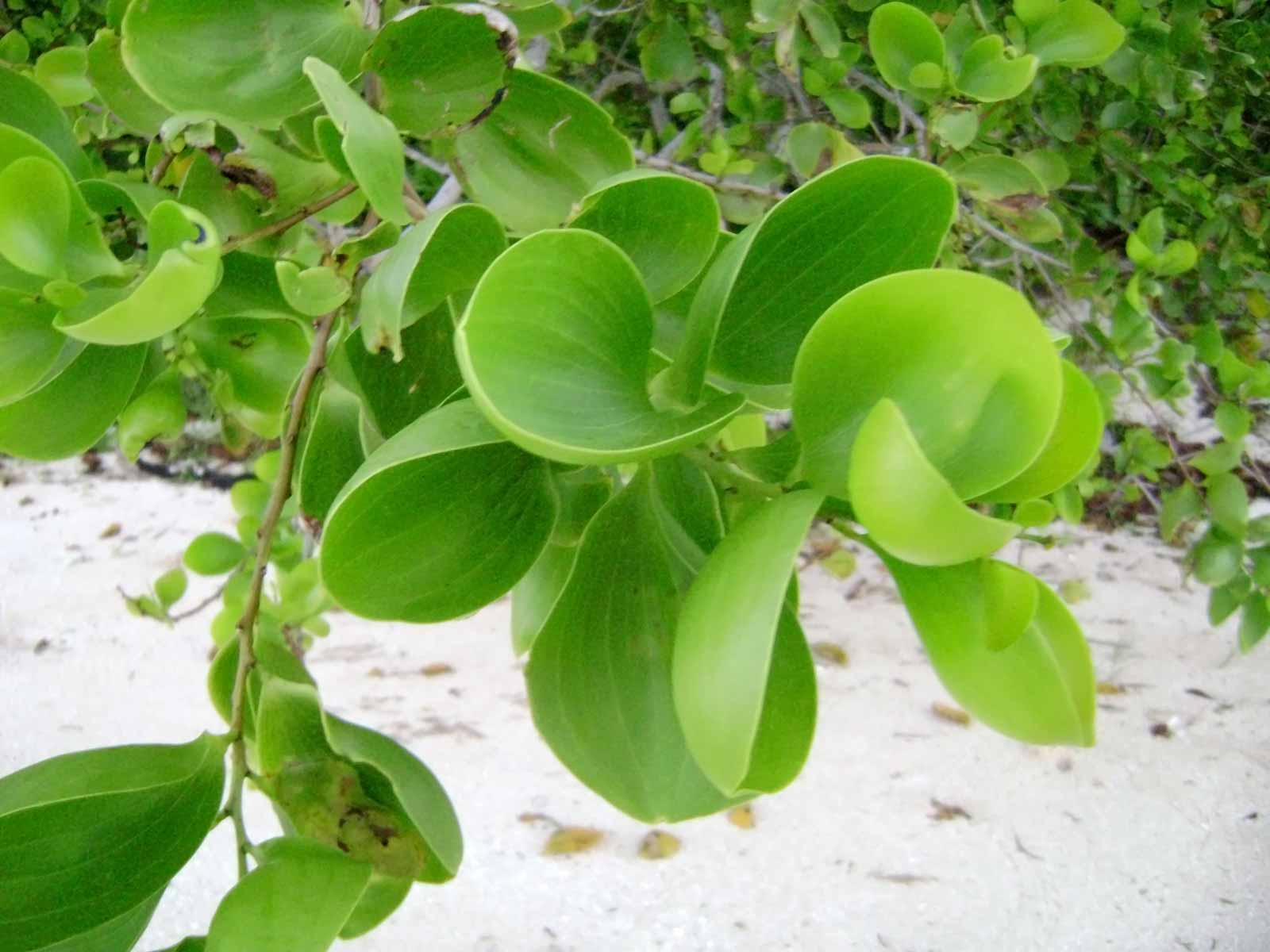

Conservation status
- Least Concern (IUCN 3.1)

Scientific classification
- Kingdom: Plantae
- Clade: Tracheophytes
- Clade: Angiosperms
- Clade: Eudicots
- Clade: Rosids
- Order: Fabales
- Family: Fabaceae
- Subfamily: Caesalpinioideae
- Clade: Mimosoid clade
- Genus: Acacia
- Species: A. simplex

Binomial name
- Acacia simplex (Sparrm.) Pedley

Synonyms
- Acacia laurifolia A.Gray; Acacia laurifolia Willd.; Acacia simplicifolia Druce; Mimosa simplicifolia L.f.

= Acacia simplex =

Species of plant

Acacia simplex is a perennial climbing tree native to islands in the western part of the Pacific Ocean as far east as Savaiʻi. This tree grows up to 12 m in height.

There is no common English name, but it is called tatakia in Fiji, tatagia in Samoa, tātāngia in Tonga and Martaoui in New-Caledonia

== Uses ==
The tree is used as a toxin in fishing. It incapacitates the fish, but it is apparently not harmful to people.

== Phytochemicals ==
=== Bark ===
- N-methyltryptamine
- N,N-dimethyltryptamine
- 2-methyl-1,2,3,4-tetrahydro-β-carboline

=== Leafy stems ===
- N-methyltryptamine
- N,N-dimethyltryptamine
- 2-methyl-1,2,3,4-tetrahydro-β-carboline
- N,N-formylmethyltryptamine
- Traces of another unidentified alkaloid

=== Stem bark ===
Total alkaloids 3.6% of which 40% N-methyltryptamine, 22.5% N,N-dimethyltryptamine, 12.7% 2-methyl-1,2,3,4-tetrahydro-β-carboline.

=== Twigs ===
Total alkaloids 0.11%, of which N-methyltryptamine is 26.3%, 6.2% N,N-dimethyltryptamine, 5.8% 2-methyl-1,2,3,4-tetrahyrdo-β-carboline, 1.6% N,N-formylmethyltryptamine.

== See also ==
- Psychedelic plants
