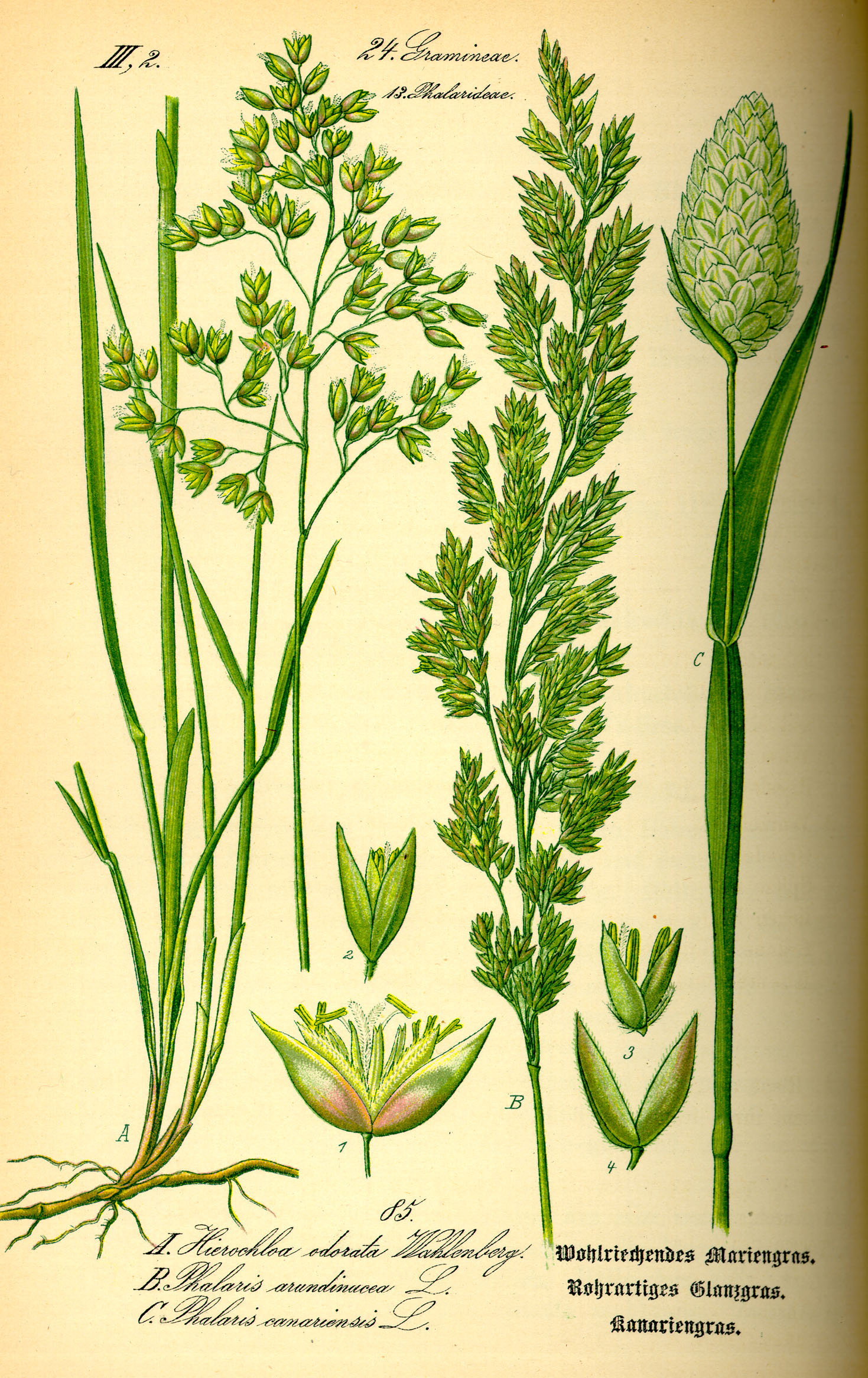
- Rightmost illustration is Phalaris canariensis

Scientific classification
- Kingdom: Plantae
- Clade: Tracheophytes
- Clade: Angiosperms
- Clade: Monocots
- Clade: Commelinids
- Order: Poales
- Family: Poaceae
- Subfamily: Pooideae
- Genus: Phalaris
- Species: P. canariensis

Binomial name
- Phalaris canariensis L.

= Canary grass =

Species of grass

Canary grass is a plant, Phalaris canariensis, belonging to the family Poaceae. Originally a native of the Mediterranean region, it is now grown commercially in several parts of the world for birdseed.

== Description ==
Phalaris canariensis resembles Phalaris arundinacea (reed canary grass), a perennial forage crop and a wild grass. Although heads of both crops are panicles, Phalaris canariensis heads resemble club wheat. This large, coarse grass has erect, hairless stems, usually from 2 to 6 feet (0.61 to 1.83 m) tall. The ligule is prominent and membranous, 1/4 inch (0.64 cm) long and rounded at the apex. The gradually tapering leaf blades are 3 1/2 to 10 inches (8.9 to 25.4 cm) long, 1/4 to 3/4 inch (0.64 to 1.91 cm) wide, flat, and often harsh on both surfaces. The compact panicles are erect or sometimes slightly spreading and range from 3 to 16 inches (7.6 to 40.6 cm) long with branches 1/2 to 1 1/2 inches (1.3 to 3.8 cm) long. Single flowers occur in dense clusters in May to mid-June or August. Inflorescences are green or slightly purple at first, then become tan.

== Seeds ==
The seeds are shiny brown. The seed is used as bird food and is generally mixed with rapeseed and other seeds that cheapen it. It should be kept in a dry place and away from vermin. Industrially, a flour made from seed is employed in the manufacture of fine cotton goods and silk stuffs.

In the Canary Islands, Italy and North Africa, Phalaris canariensis is used as food. In certain parts of Mexico, such as Valle de Bravo, it is prepared and sold by street food vendors as a much appreciated form of atole. However, the seed hulls appear to contain silica fibers, which are linked to esophageal cancer. In 2013, a new hull-less or glabrous variety was announced as a gluten-free food for humans.

Canary seed yield

Production of canary seeds
