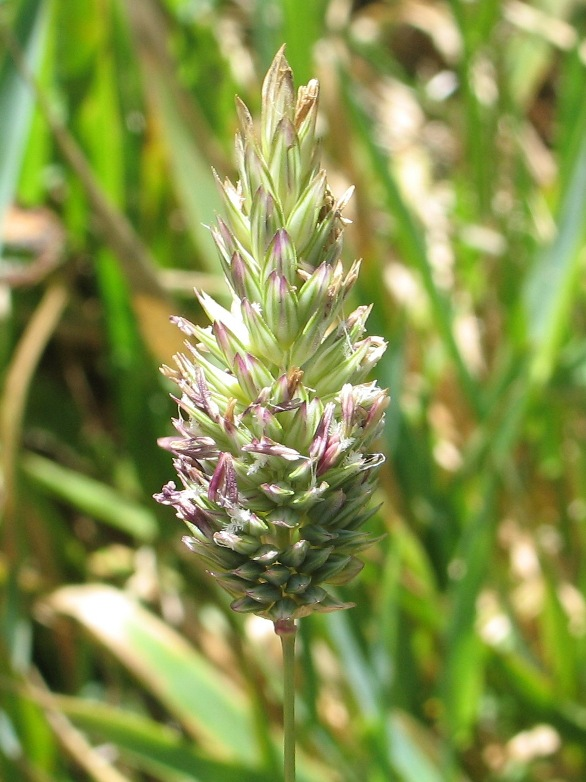

Scientific classification
- Kingdom: Plantae
- Clade: Tracheophytes
- Clade: Angiosperms
- Clade: Monocots
- Clade: Commelinids
- Order: Poales
- Family: Poaceae
- Subfamily: Pooideae
- Genus: Phalaris
- Species: P. californica

Binomial name
- Phalaris californica Hook. & Arn.

= Phalaris californica =

Species of flowering plant

Phalaris californica is an uncommon species of grass known by the common name California canarygrass.

== Distribution ==
It is native to the coastal hills and mountains of southern Oregon, as well as northern and central California, where it grows mainly in moist areas such as meadows.

== Description ==
It is a perennial grass reaching a maximum height between half a meter and 1.5 meters. The inflorescence is up to 5 centimeters long and 3 centimeters wide, roughly oval, pointed at the tip, and truncated at the base. The spikelets are hairy and, as they ripen, they turn shades of magenta to bright pink.
