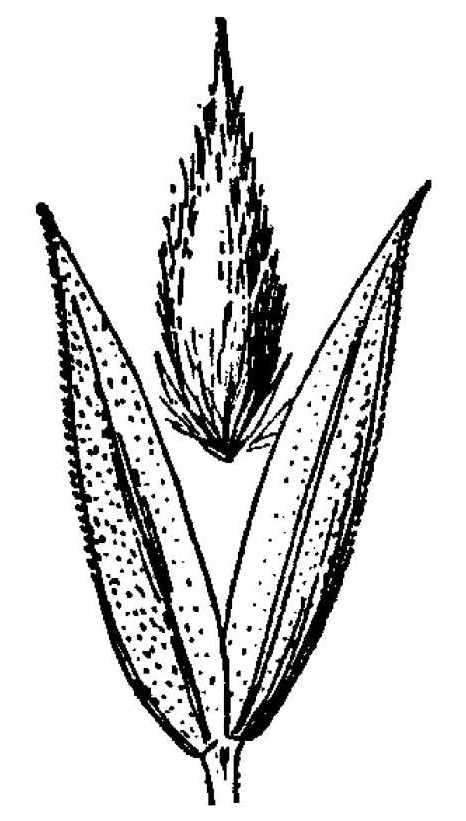

Scientific classification
- Kingdom: Plantae
- Clade: Tracheophytes
- Clade: Angiosperms
- Clade: Monocots
- Clade: Commelinids
- Order: Poales
- Family: Poaceae
- Subfamily: Pooideae
- Genus: Phalaris
- Species: P. lemmonii

Binomial name
- Phalaris lemmonii Vasey

= Phalaris lemmonii =

Species of flowering plant

Phalaris lemmonii is an uncommon species of grass known by the common name Lemmon's canarygrass. It is endemic to California, where it can be found in coastal and inland mountain ranges and the Central Valley.

== Description ==
It grows mainly in moist areas. It is an annual grass reaching maximum heights between 1.3 and 1.5 meters. The cylindrical inflorescence is up to 12 centimeters long, each spikelet made up of one strongly beaked fertile floret and one or two sterile florets.
