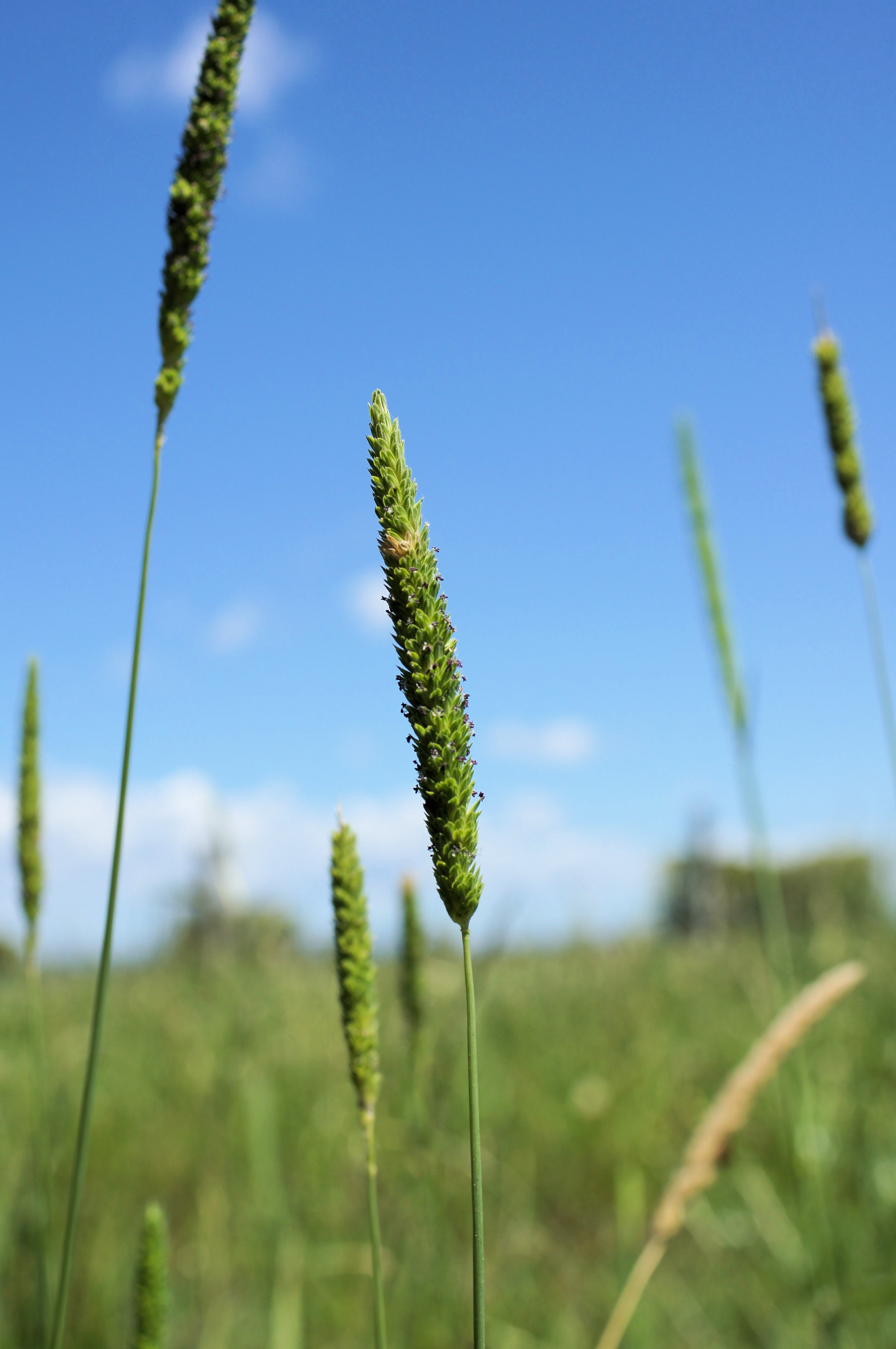

Scientific classification
- Kingdom: Plantae
- Clade: Tracheophytes
- Clade: Angiosperms
- Clade: Monocots
- Clade: Commelinids
- Order: Poales
- Family: Poaceae
- Subfamily: Pooideae
- Genus: Phalaris
- Species: P. angusta

Binomial name
- Phalaris angusta Nees ex Trin.

= Phalaris angusta =

Species of flowering plant

Phalaris angusta is a species of grass known by the common names timothy canarygrass and narrow canarygrass. It is native to the Americas, where it is most common in Chile and Argentina and can be found in northern South America and sections of the southwestern and southeastern United States. It is also known as an introduced species in Australia. It grows in grassland, prairie, marshland, and other habitat.

== Description ==
Phalaris angusta is an annual grass reaching as much as 2.5 meters tall. The inflorescence is a narrow cylindrical spike of rough-haired, pointed spikelets.

=== Toxicity ===
Like some other Phalaris species, this grass is toxic to livestock. Calves that eat the grass develop neurological signs such as tremors and convulsions and gross examination of their brain tissue reveals large blue-green lesions. Some cattle and sheep die suddenly after grazing in pastures of the grass, while some linger with signs of neurological compromise.
