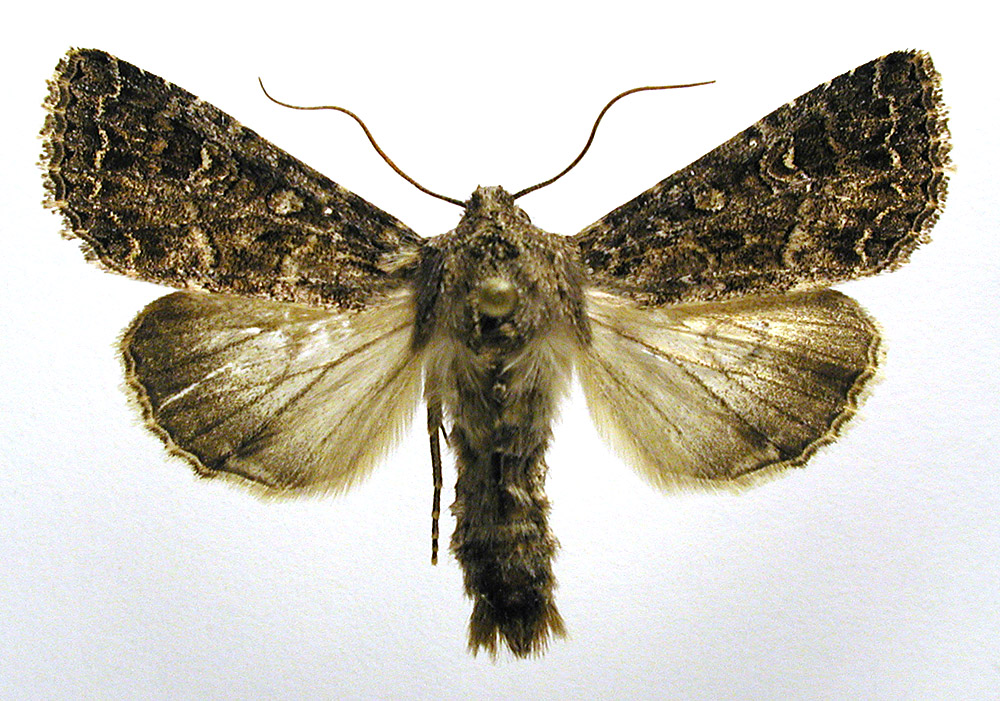

Scientific classification
- Domain: Eukaryota
- Kingdom: Animalia
- Phylum: Arthropoda
- Class: Insecta
- Order: Lepidoptera
- Superfamily: Noctuoidea
- Family: Noctuidae
- Genus: Apamea
- Species: A. furva

Binomial name
- Apamea furva (Denis & Schiffermüller, 1775)

Synonyms
- Noctua furva Denis & Schiffermüller, 1775; Phalaena (Noctua) impressa Esper, 1804; Noctua freyeri Boie, 1835; Mamestra infernalis Eversmann, 1842; Mamestra gemmosa Herrich-Schäffer, 1855; Mamestra furva f. italica Turati & Verity, 1911; Apamea furva britannica Cockayne, 1950

= Apamea furva =

Confused

Species of moth

Apamea furva, the confused, is a moth of the family Noctuidae. The species was first described by Michael Denis and Ignaz Schiffermüller in 1775. It is found throughout Europe. In southwestern Europe it is primarily montane. It is found as far north as the Arctic Circle. From Europe its range extends to Siberia, Turkey, Iran, Kyrgyzstan, Mongolia and Xinjiang in China.

The population in Great Britain and Ireland is sometimes treated as a subspecies, Apamea furva britannica.

The wingspan is 34–42 mm. Forewing varying from brownish to blackish fuscous, more or less dusted with grey or whitish scales, especially along the costa and inner margin and along the veins; lines conversely edged with pale; claviform stigma black-edged, or filled in with black; orbicular grey, with pale ring and black outline, often obscure; reniform always whiter, especially on outer edge; submarginal line whitish, waved, always preceded by distinct black wedge-shaped marks; the brown fringe finely cut by pale dashes; hindwing smoky grey, the terminal half smoky fuscous; veins and cellspot darker; the blackish fuscous forms, still with paler dusting, are ab. freyeri [Boie] and infernalis Ev. the latter being the darker. Apamea furva is difficult to certainly distinguish from its congener Apamea remissa (Hübner, 1809). See Townsend et al.

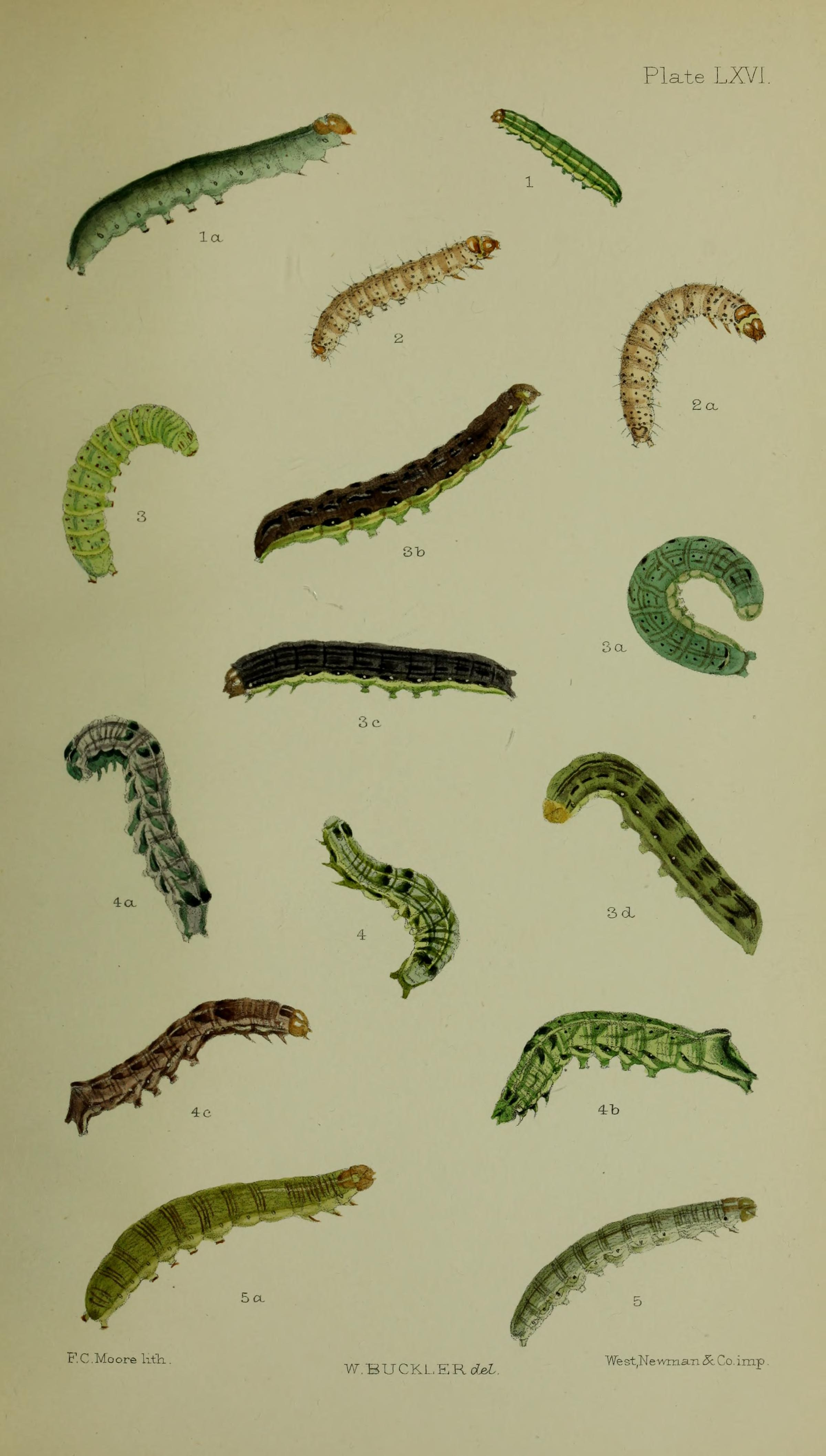
Figs 2, 2a larva after last moult

Adults are on wing from July to August.

The larvae feed on the roots and stem bases of various grasses, including meadowgrasses, fescues, slimstem reedgrass, and wavy hairgrass.
