= Dimethylhomotryptamine =

Clinical data
- Other names: DMHT; U-6056; U6056; N,N-Dimethylhomotryptamine; 3-[3-(Dimethylamino)propyl]indole
- Drug class: Serotonin receptor modulator
- ATC code: None

Identifiers
- IUPAC name: 3-(1H-indol-3-yl)-N,N-dimethylpropan-1-amine
- CAS Number: 13117-35-6
- PubChem CID: 52549
- ChemSpider: 47499
- ChEMBL: ChEMBL360575
- CompTox Dashboard (EPA): DTXSID00275574

Chemical and physical data
- Formula: C_{13}H_{18}N_{2}
- Molar mass: 202.301 g·mol^{−1}
- 3D model (JSmol): Interactive image
- SMILES: CN(C)CCCC1=CNC2=CC=CC=C21
- InChI: InChI=1S/C13H18N2/c1-15(2)9-5-6-11-10-14-13-8-4-3-7-12(11)13/h3-4,7-8,10,14H,5-6,9H2,1-2H3; Key:QHNWPRMHGXRBAO-UHFFFAOYSA-N

Dimethylhomotryptamine (DMHT; developmental code name U-6056), also known as N,N-dimethylhomotryptamine or as 3-[3-(dimethylamino)propyl]indole, is a homotryptamine and homologue of the psychedelic tryptamine dimethyltryptamine (DMT) in which the alkyl side chain has been lengthened by one carbon atom. The homologue of DMT in which the alkyl side chain has been shortened by one carbon atom is gramine (3-(N,N-dimethylaminomethyl)indole).

== Use and effects ==
According to Alexander Shulgin in his book TiHKAL (Tryptamines I Have Known and Loved) and other publications, DMHT was studied by the Upjohn Company under the code name U-6056. It was assessed in a clinical study of 10 individuals at doses of up to 10 mg by intravenous injection and 70 mg by intramuscular injection, but produced no psychoactive or hallucinogenic effects besides mild agitation or anxiety and caused slight increases in heart rate and blood pressure. For comparison, DMT has been reported to produce psychedelic effects at doses as low as 20 to 50 mg by intramuscular injection. The human properties and effects of the lower homologue gramine are unknown.

== Pharmacology ==
=== Pharmacodynamics ===
DMHT showed the same affinity for serotonin receptors in the rat fundus strip as dimethyltryptamine (DMT) (A_{2} = 1,000 nM and 1,000 nM, respectively). It also shows low affinity for the serotonin 5-HT_{3} receptor (K_{i} = 730 nM). The drug's analogue homotryptamine (the N,N-didesmethyl analogue) showed about 5- to 10-fold lower potency than tryptamine and DMT as a serotonin receptor agonist in the rat uterus and stomach strip and showed abolished affinity for the serotonin 5-HT_{1E} and 5-HT_{1F} receptors (K_{i} = >10,000 nM). DMHT is a potent serotonin reuptake inhibitor (SRI), with an affinity (IC_{50}) for the serotonin transporter (SERT) of 58 nM. It produced hyperthermia in rabbits.

== Chemistry ==
=== Synthesis ===
The chemical synthesis of DMHT has been described.

=== Analogues ===
Homotryptamine.

DMHT's N,N-didesmethyl analogue is homotryptamine. Other DMT and DMHT homologues with further extended alkyl side chains have been studied, but were said to have no interesting activity. The highly potent selective serotonin reuptake inhibitor (SSRI) BMS-505130 (K_{i} = 0.18 nM for the SERT) was derived via structural modification of DMHT. Conformationally constrained homotryptamine analogues acting as monoamine transporter modulators have been described as well. Gramine is an analogue of DMT and DMHT with a shortened alkyl side chain.

== History ==
DMHT was first described in the scientific literature by William J. Turner and Sidney Merlis in 1959.

== See also ==
- Arylalkylamine
- Amedalin
- Avitriptan
- Carmoxirole
- Citalopram
- Daledalin
- Escitalopram
- Indalpine
- Iprindole
- Milnacipran
