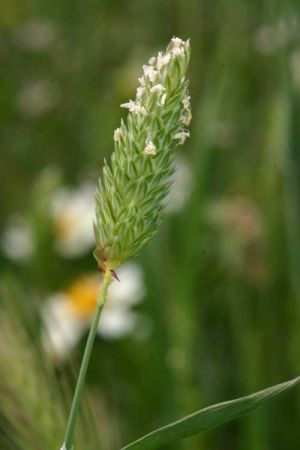

Scientific classification
- Kingdom: Plantae
- Clade: Tracheophytes
- Clade: Angiosperms
- Clade: Monocots
- Clade: Commelinids
- Order: Poales
- Family: Poaceae
- Subfamily: Pooideae
- Genus: Phalaris
- Species: P. minor

Binomial name
- Phalaris minor Retz.

= Phalaris minor =

Species of plant

Phalaris minor is a species of grass native to North Africa, Europe, and South Asia. The bunchgrass is widely naturalised elsewhere.

Common names include little seed canary grass, small-seeded canary grass, small canary grass, lesser-canary grass, guli danda (Hindi), and sittee booti (Urdu).

== Description ==
Phalaris minor grows as a tufted annual bunchgrass up to 1.8 metres (5.9 ft) in height. It has a spike-like panicle.

== Taxonomy ==
It has had an uneventful taxonomic history. It was first published under its current name by Anders Jahan Retzius in 1783, and has retained that name since. It has no synonyms, and no infraspecific taxa.

== Uses ==
It is used as a fodder or forage for livestock and birdseed, but is poisonous to some mammals, and is a potential contaminant of seed crops.
