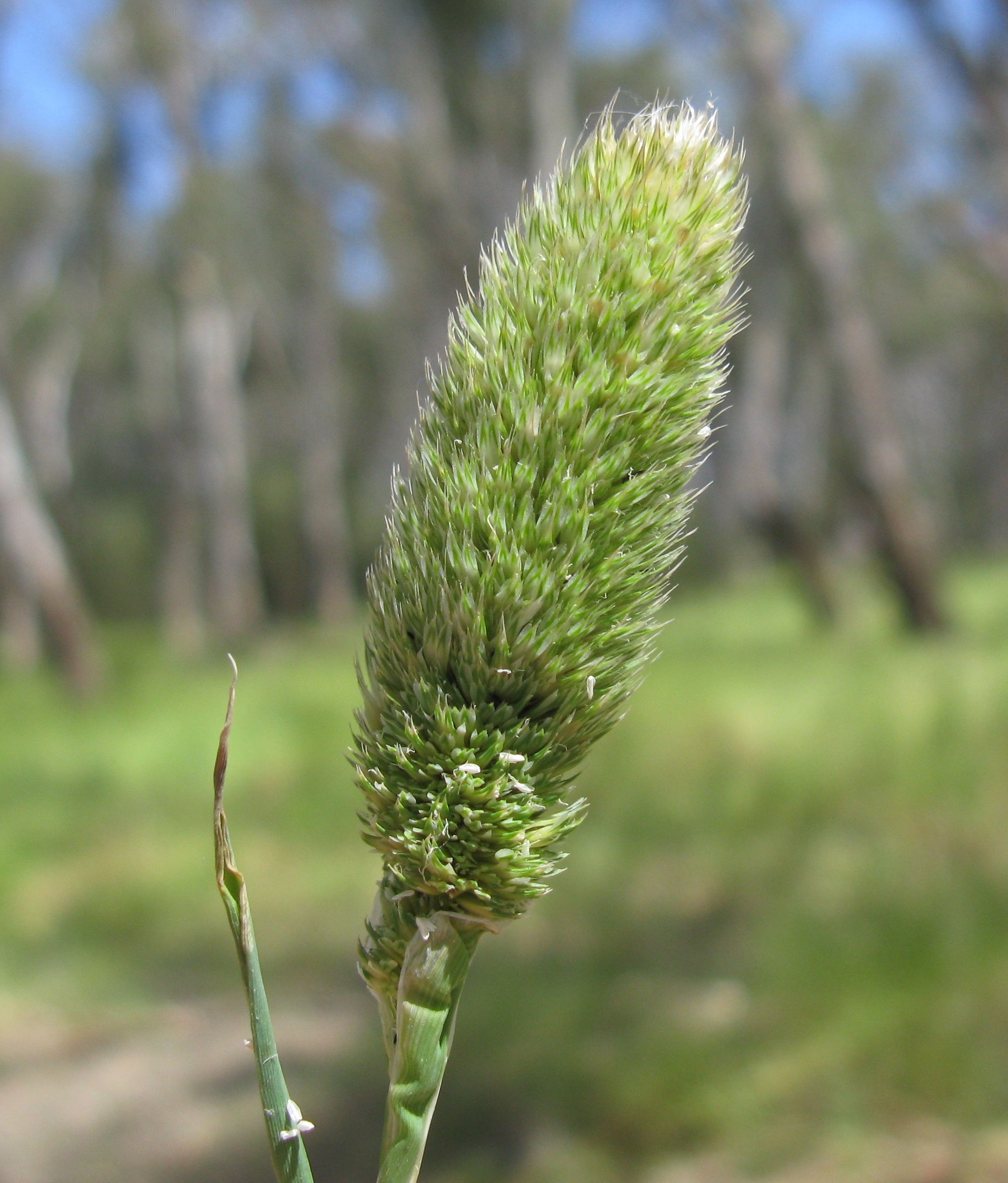

Scientific classification
- Kingdom: Plantae
- Clade: Tracheophytes
- Clade: Angiosperms
- Clade: Monocots
- Clade: Commelinids
- Order: Poales
- Family: Poaceae
- Subfamily: Pooideae
- Genus: Phalaris
- Species: P. paradoxa

Binomial name
- Phalaris paradoxa L.

= Phalaris paradoxa =

Species of grass

Phalaris paradoxa is a species of grass in genus Phalaris. Common names include awned canary-grass and hood canarygrass.

The spikelets are very different from those of other members of this genus. The spikelet glumes each have a hook.

It is native to Africa, Asia, and Europe, and it has been introduced widely. Its distribution within the United States includes Arizona, California, Hawaii, Louisiana, Maryland, New Jersey, Oregon, Pennsylvania, Washington.
