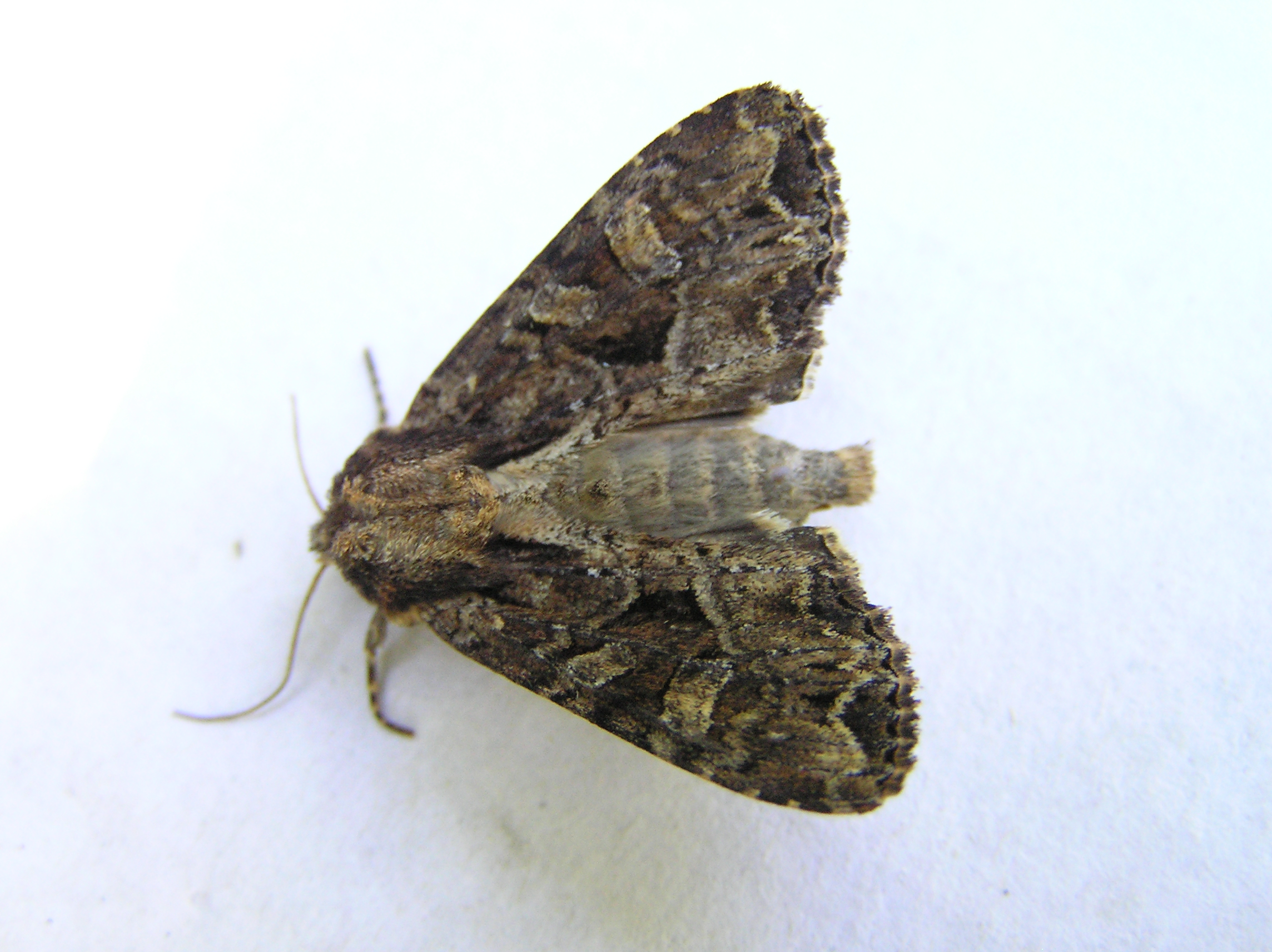

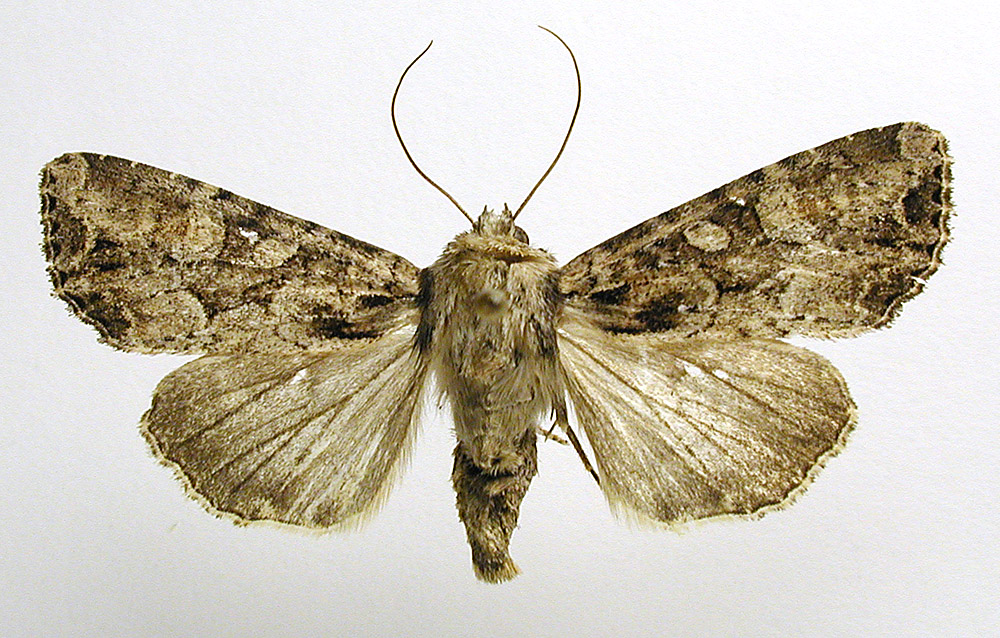

Scientific classification
- Kingdom: Animalia
- Phylum: Arthropoda
- Class: Insecta
- Order: Lepidoptera
- Superfamily: Noctuoidea
- Family: Noctuidae
- Genus: Apamea
- Species: A. remissa

Binomial name
- Apamea remissa (Hübner, 1809)

= Apamea remissa =

Dusky brocade

Species of moth

Apamea remissa, the dusky brocade, is a species of moth of the family Noctuidae. It is distributed throughout Europe and Turkey, ranging across the Palearctic realm to Siberia, Manchuria and Japan. It has also been reported from Alaska.

Some authors consider Apamea indocilis to be a subspecies of Apamea remissa.

== Description ==
This species has a wingspan of 36 to 42 mm. Well-marked individuals are fairly distinctive, but forms with obscure markings can be difficult to distinguish from other species. The typical form has pale greyish-brown forewings with dark markings, including a large blackish mark near the dorsum and two spots at the termen. The difference between the ground colour and the dark shading is pronounced, the ground being pale grey, often reddish tinted, and the markings blackish fuscous;some black wedge shaped marks before submarginal line; the upper stigmata whitish. The hindwings are greyish with darker venation.

== Technical description and variation ==
as P. obscura Haw. (= gemina Hbn., anceps Dup.) (40 c). Forewing reddish brown mixed with grey, especially along costa and inner margin; inner and outer lines dark, conversely edged with pale, and lunulate-dentate; submarginal line pale grey, preceded by a brown shade, the terminal area dark fuscous; claviform obscure, dark edged; orbicular and reniform grey with whitish annuli; hindwing dirty whitish grey with dark veins and cellspot, the termen diffusely dark fuscous; — in the ab. submissa Tr. (40 d) the forewing has a short black streak from base below cell, and another on inner margin near base, often with dark cloud above its end; a black streak along submedian fold between inner and outer lines, below which the inner marginal area is paler; the dark suffusion on the rest of wing somewhat stronger; in ab. remissa Hbn. (= supermissa Spul.) (40 d) the difference between the ground colour and the dark shading is still more marked, the ground being pale grey, often reddish tinted, and the markings blackish fuscous; some black wedge shaped marks before submarginal line; the upper stigmata whitish. Larva grey brown; the tubercles blackish; dorsal line whitish, subdorsal lines pale; spiracular line broader, pale grey, edged above with dark: spiracles black; head and thoracic plate black brown. Apamea remissa is difficult to certainly distinguish from is congener Apamea furva. See Townsend et al.

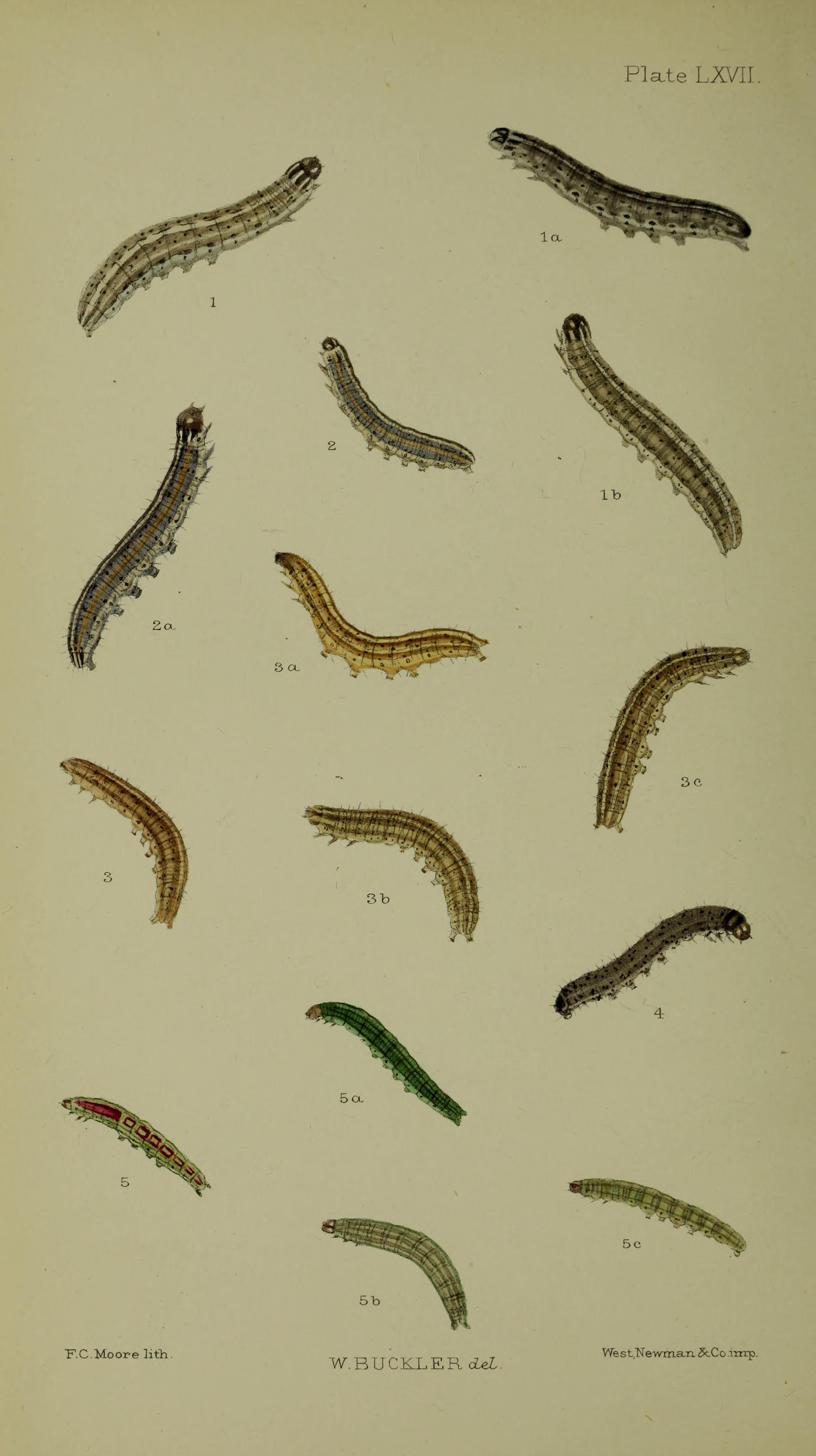
Figs 2 larva before last moult 2a larva after last moult

== Biology ==
This moth flies at night and is attracted to light, sugar and nectar-rich flowers. In the British Isles the moth is active in June and July.

The larva feeds on various grasses, including reedgrasses, tussock grasses, fescues, canarygrasses, and ryes. This species overwinters as a larva, feeding during mild weather.
