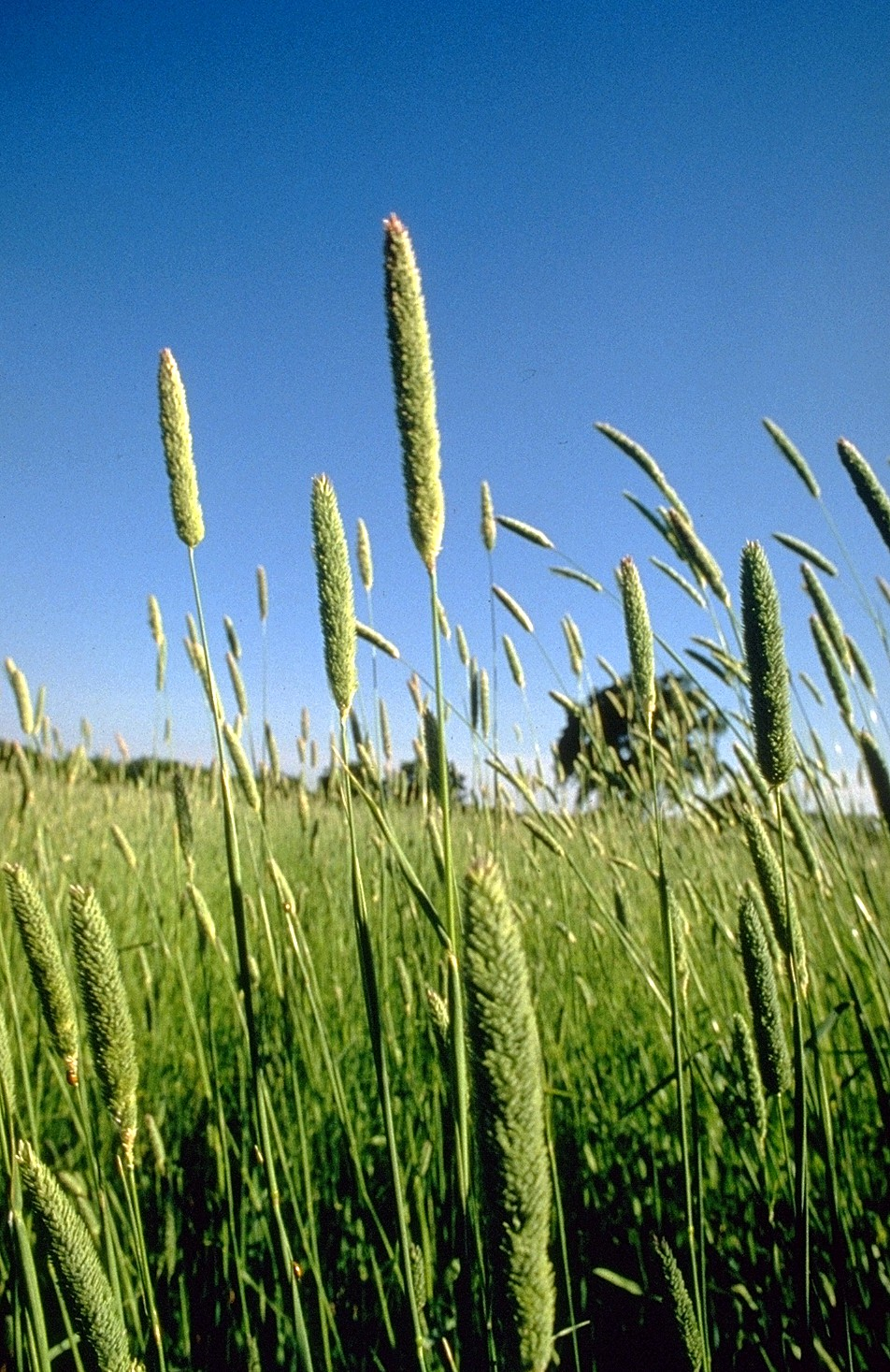

Scientific classification
- Kingdom: Plantae
- Clade: Tracheophytes
- Clade: Angiosperms
- Clade: Monocots
- Clade: Commelinids
- Order: Poales
- Family: Poaceae
- Subfamily: Pooideae
- Genus: Phalaris
- Species: P. aquatica

Binomial name
- Phalaris aquatica L.

Synonyms
- Phalaris tuberosa

= Phalaris aquatica =

Species of plant

Phalaris aquatica, known by the common names bulbous canary-grass and Harding grass, is a species of grass in the genus Phalaris of the family Poaceae.

== Description ==
It is an erect, waist-high, stout perennial bunch grass, with grayish to bluish green leaves. Flowering heads are dense, spike-like, and usually 2 to 5 inches (50 to 125 mm) long. It is slow to develop from seed, but can form large bunches after several years.

Phalaris arundinacea (reed canary grass) differs from Harding grass in having more distinct rhizomes, and an inflorescence that is compact at first but becomes more open as the branches spread.

Interspecific hybrids between Phalaris aquatica and Phalaris arundinacea have been produced through plant breeding programs to combine agronomic traits from both species.

P. aquatica is a quick-growing grass which incorporates and utilises soil nitrogen rapidly.

== Geography ==
Phalaris aquatica originated from Southern Europe and the Caucasus. It is naturalized in South Africa, Australia, New Zealand and the United States. Although very recently introduced there, its pasture value was first recognised in Australia. Domesticated cultivation then spread to the United States, Argentina and several other countries in South America, and New Zealand.

== Constituents ==
Phalaris aquatica contains a variety of secondary metabolites, primarily indole and tryptamine alkaloids, which are implicated in livestock toxicity.

Isolated chemical constituents of Phalaris aquatica
Compound name	Reference
5,7-Dimethoxygramine	
5-Hydroxy-N,N-dimethyltryptamine (Bufotenin)	
5-Methoxygramine	
5-Methoxy-N,N-dimethyltryptamine (5-MeO-DMT)	
7-Methoxygramine	
Gramine	
N,N-Dimethyltryptamine (DMT)	
N-Methyltryptamine (NMT)	

== Agricultural use ==
Phalaris aquatica is commercial propagated as a cultivated pasture plant and can provide high-quality fodder for 8 to 12 months of the year. It has been widely adopted in pasture management due to its fast growth rate and high nutritional value. Breeding and selection programs in Argentina, several states of the USA, New Zealand, Israel, Tunisia, and Greece also produced cultivars such as Sirocco, Sirolan, Holdfast and Landmaster with specific adaptations to address agronomic challenges such as toxicity, seed shattering, and acid soil tolerance.

== Toxicity ==
Grazing on Phalaris-dominated pastures can cause livestock toxicoses:

- Phalaris staggers: A chronic neurological condition associated with ruminants grazing Phalaris containing toxic alkaloids; appropriate cobalt supplementation can reduce the risk of the staggers syndrome.
- Sudden death: Acute mortality caused by peracute ammonia toxicity from young shoot consumption; not preventable by cobalt.

Low-alkaloid cultivars are widely used to reduce grazing risk.

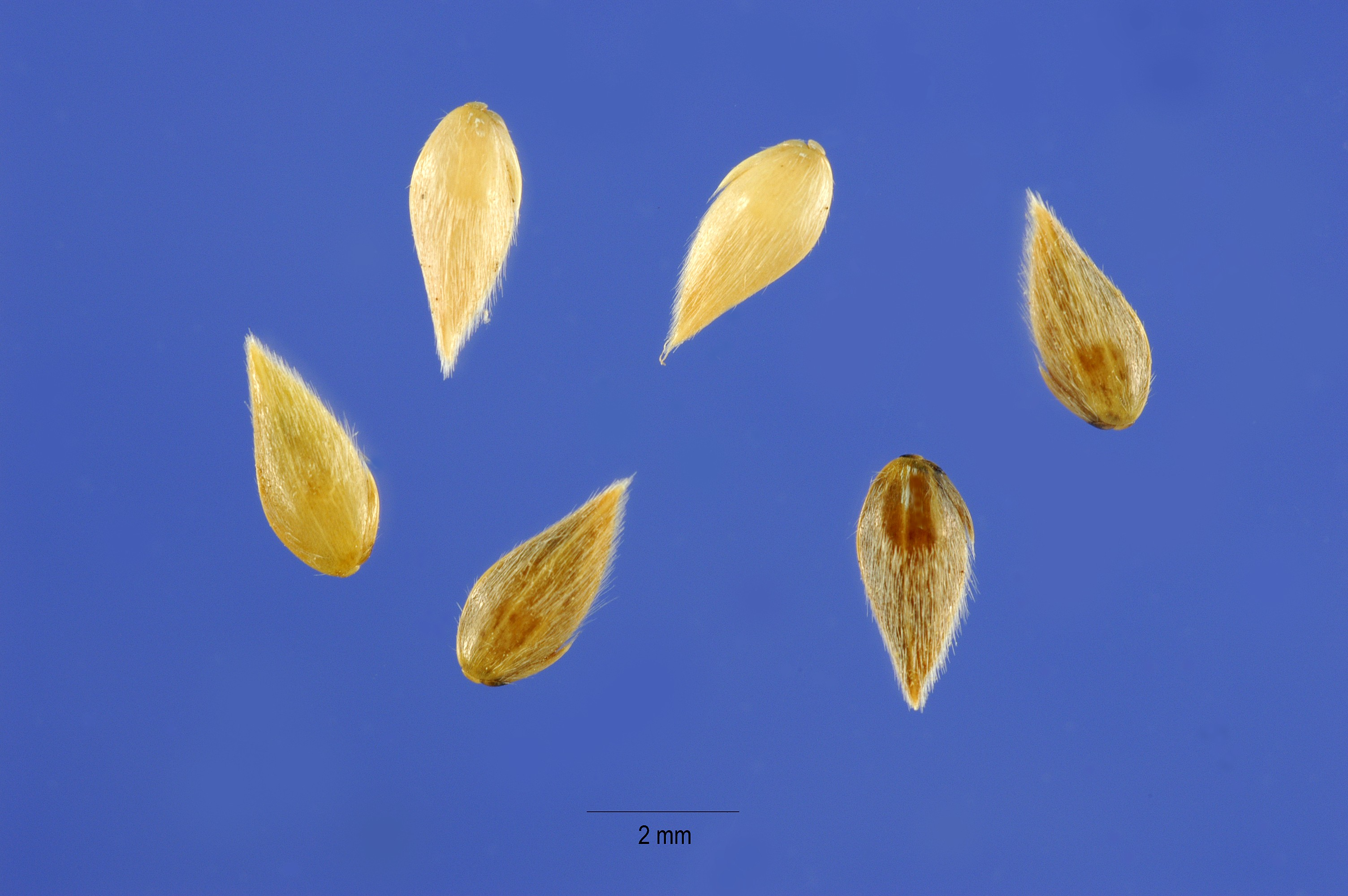
Seeds

In Victoria, Australia, it is reported that kangaroos grazing on Phalaris aquatica may develop a condition known familiarly as "Phalaris staggers", in which coordination and mobility are affected.

== Invasive species ==
Harding grass is an invasive species in grassland, oak woodland, chaparral, and riparian habitats. Native grasses and grassland habitat in California are affected.
