= Phalaris truncata =

Scientific classification
- Kingdom: Plantae
- Clade: Tracheophytes
- Clade: Angiosperms
- Clade: Monocots
- Clade: Commelinids
- Order: Poales
- Family: Poaceae
- Subfamily: Pooideae
- Genus: Phalaris
- Species: P. truncata

Binomial name
- Phalaris truncata Guss.

Species of plant

Phalaris truncata is a species of plant in the family Poaceae (true grasses). They are associated with freshwater habitat.

== Sources ==
This article incorporates text from a free content work. Licensed under CC0 (license statement/permission). Text taken from Phalaris truncata. Encyclopedia of Life.
