= Cyathobasis =

Scientific classification
- Kingdom: Plantae
- Clade: Tracheophytes
- Clade: Angiosperms
- Clade: Eudicots
- Order: Caryophyllales
- Family: Amaranthaceae
- Genus: Cyathobasis; Aellen (1949)
- Species: C. fruticulosa

Binomial name
- Cyathobasis fruticulosa (Bunge) Aellen (1949)

Synonyms
- Girgensohnia fruticulosa Bunge (1862); Noaea oppositifolia Boiss. ex Bunge (1862), not validly publ.

Genus of flowering plants

Cyathobasis fruticulosa is a species of flowering plant belonging to the family Amaranthaceae. It is the sole species in genus Cyathobasis. It is a subshrub native to Turkey.
