= BMS-505130 =

Clinical data
- Other names: BMS505130
- Routes of administration: Oral
- Drug class: Selective serotonin reuptake inhibitor (SSRI)
- ATC code: None

Identifiers
- IUPAC name: 3-[(1S,2S)-2-[(dimethylamino)methyl]cyclopropyl]-1H-indole-5-carbonitrile
- CAS Number: 468715-83-5
- PubChem CID: 11310988
- ChemSpider: 9485956
- UNII: WR55VTJ7AL
- ChEMBL: ChEMBL196468

Chemical and physical data
- Formula: C_{15}H_{17}N_{3}
- Molar mass: 239.322 g·mol^{−1}
- 3D model (JSmol): Interactive image
- SMILES: CN(C)C[C@H]1C[C@@H]1C2=CNC3=C2C=C(C=C3)C#N
- InChI: InChI=1S/C15H17N3/c1-18(2)9-11-6-12(11)14-8-17-15-4-3-10(7-16)5-13(14)15/h3-5,8,11-12,17H,6,9H2,1-2H3/t11-,12+/m1/s1; Key:DEMWBYUAYXJYOC-NEPJUHHUSA-N

BMS-505130 is a selective serotonin reuptake inhibitor (SSRI) related to dimethylhomotryptamine (DMHT) as well as tryptamines like dimethyltryptamine (DMT) which was never marketed.

It is a potent and selective SSRI, with an affinity (K_{i}) of 0.18 nM for the serotonin transporter (SERT) and dramatically lower affinities for the norepinephrine transporter (NET) and dopamine transporter (DAT) (K_{i} = 4,600 nM and 2,100 nM, respectively). The drug also showed only low affinity for the serotonin 5-HT_{1A} and 5-HT_{6} receptors (K_{i} = 410 nM and 270 nM, respectively) and no affinity for several other serotonin receptors. It is orally active with a relatively short elimination half-life and duration in rodents. BMS-505130 robustly increases brain serotonin levels and produces antidepressant-like effects in rodents.

The chemical synthesis of BMS-505130 has been described.

BMS-505130 was first described in the scientific literature by 2005. It has been suggested that it might be useful in the treatment of premature ejaculation due to its short duration. The drug was developed by Bristol-Myers Squibb but did not proceed beyond preclinical research.

== See also ==
- Dimethylhomotryptamine (DMHT)
- Phenylcyclopropylmethylamine
