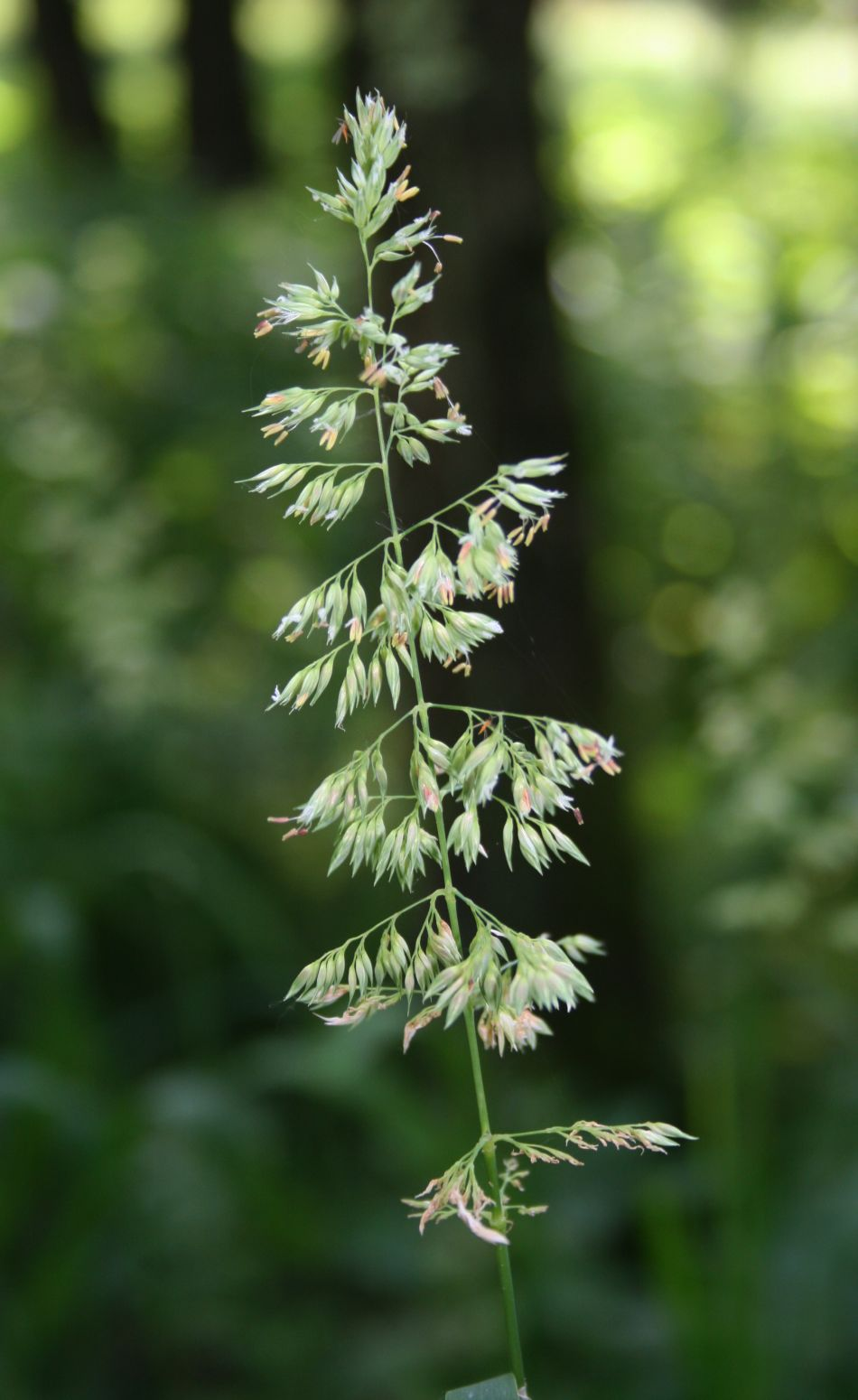

Conservation status
- Least Concern (IUCN 3.1)

- Secure (NatureServe)

Scientific classification
- Kingdom: Plantae
- Clade: Embryophytes
- Clade: Tracheophytes
- Clade: Angiosperms
- Clade: Monocots
- Clade: Commelinids
- Order: Poales
- Family: Poaceae
- Subfamily: Pooideae
- Genus: Phalaris
- Species: P. arundinacea

Binomial name
- Phalaris arundinacea L.

= Phalaris arundinacea =

Species of plant

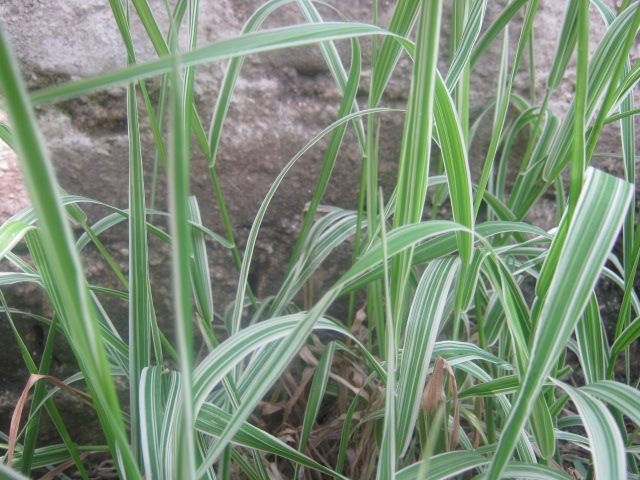
Variegated form, garden of Islington College, Nepal

Phalaris arundinacea, or reed canary grass, is a tall, perennial grass that commonly forms extensive single-species stands along the margins of lakes and streams and in wet open areas, with a wide distribution in Europe, Asia, northern Africa and North America. Other common names for the plant include gardener's-garters and ribbon grass in English, alpiste roseau in French, Rohrglanzgras in German, kusa-yoshi in Japanese, caniço-malhado in Portuguese, and hierba cinta and pasto cinto in Spanish.

== Description ==
The stems can reach 2 metres (6.6 ft) in height. The leaf blades are usually green, but may be variegated. The panicles are up to 30 centimetres (12 in) long. The spikelets are light green, often streaked with darker green or purple. This is a perennial grass which spreads underground by its thick rhizomes.

== Uses ==
A number of cultivars of P. arundinacea have been selected for use as ornamental plants, including variegated (striped) cultivars – sometimes called ribbon grass – such as 'Castor' and 'Feesey'. The latter has a pink tinge to the leaves. When grown, although drought-tolerant, it likes abundant water and can even be grown as an aquatic plant.

Reed canary grass grows well on poor soil and contaminated industrial sites. Researchers at Teesside University's Contaminated Land & Water Centre have suggested it is ideal for phytoremediation, which improves soil quality and biodiversity at brownfield sites.

The grass can also easily be turned into bricks or pellets for burning in biomass power stations. Furthermore, it provides fibers which find use in pulp and papermaking processes.

P. arundinacea is also planted as a hay crop or for forage.

This species of Phalaris may also be used as a source of the psychedelic drugs DMT, 5-MeO-DMT and 5-OH-DMT (bufotenin), as well as Hordenine and 5-MeO-NMT; however, N,N-DMT is considered most desirable. Although the concentrations of these compounds are lower than in other potential sources, such as Psychotria viridis and Mimosa tenuiflora, large enough quantities of the grass can be refined to make an ad hoc ayahuasca brew.

== Ecology ==
In many places, P. arundinacea is an invasive species in wetlands, particularly in disturbed areas. It has been reported as an invasive weed in floodplains, riverside meadows, and other wetland habitats around the world. When P. arundinacea invades a wetland, it inhibits native vegetation and reduces biological diversity. It alters the entire ecosystem. The grass propagates by seed and rhizome, and once established, is difficult to eradicate.

== Distribution ==
P. arundinacea now has a worldwide distribution. While it is generally considered to be native to both North America and Eurasia, this is a matter of debate. It appears that the North American populations are a mixture of introduced European cultivars and indigenous varieties.

== Chemical properties ==
Specimens contain varying levels of hordenine and gramine.

Leaves of P. arundinacea contain DMT, 5-MeO-DMT and related compounds. Levels of beta-carbolines and hordenine have also been reported.
