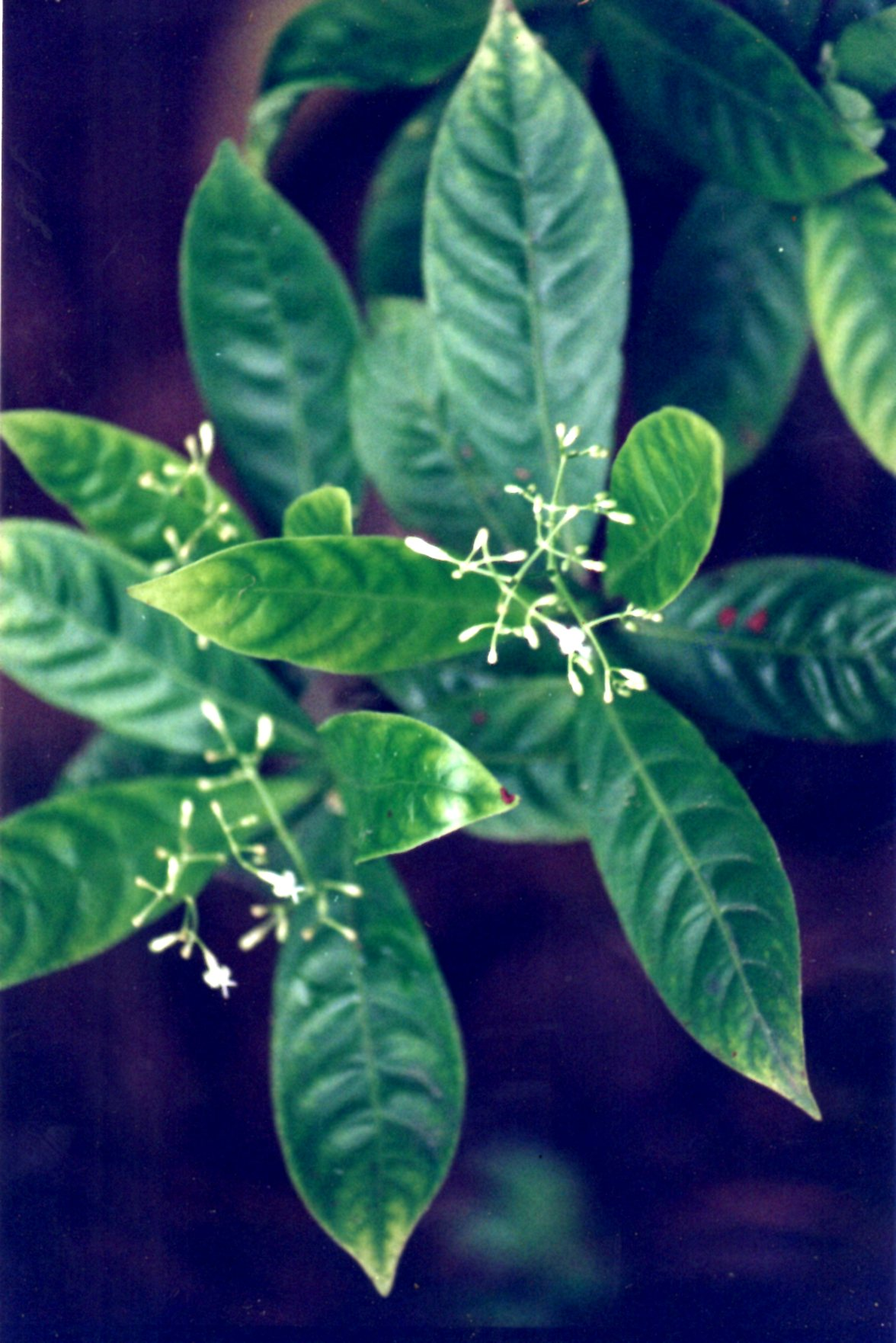

Conservation status
- Least Concern (IUCN 3.1)

Scientific classification
- Kingdom: Plantae
- Clade: Tracheophytes
- Clade: Angiosperms
- Clade: Eudicots
- Clade: Asterids
- Order: Gentianales
- Family: Rubiaceae
- Genus: Psychotria
- Species: P. viridis

Binomial name
- Psychotria viridis Ruiz & Pav.

Synonyms
- Palicourea viridis (Ruiz & Pav.) Schult.; Psychotria glomerata Kunth; Psychotria microdesmia Oerst.; Psychotria trispicata Griseb.; Uragoga glomerata (Kunth) Kuntze; Uragoga microdesmia (Oerst.) Kuntze; Uragoga trispicata (Griseb.) Kuntze; Uragoga viridis (Ruiz & Pav.) Kuntze

= Psychotria viridis =

Perennial flowering plant in the coffee family Rubiaceae

Psychotria viridis, also known as chacruna, chacrona, or chaqruy in the Quechua languages, is a perennial, shrubby flowering plant in the coffee family Rubiaceae. It is a close relative of Psychotria carthagenensis (a.k.a. samiruka or amiruca) of Ecuador. It is commonly used as an ingredient of ayahuasca, a decoction with a long history of its entheogenic (connecting to spirit) use and its status as a "plant teacher" among the Indigenous peoples of the Amazon rainforest.

== Description ==
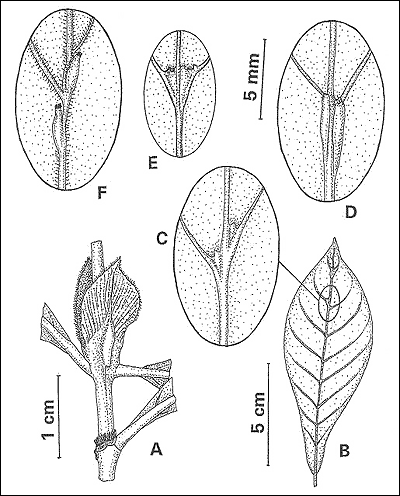
Vegetative Characteristics

P. viridis is a perennial shrub that grows to a height of approximately 5 m (16 ft). Its branches span a diameter of about 2 m (6 ft 7 in)

=== Stems ===
In the middle and lower parts of the stem, situated between the insertion points of the two opposite leaves there is a horizontal scar 0.3–1 mm (0.012–0.039 in) wide that extends between the leaves (or leaf scars) and sometimes also connects over the tops of these scars, and along the top side of this scar there is a dense, usually furry line of fine trichomes (i.e., plant hairs) usually 0.5–1 mm (0.020–0.039 in) long that are reddish brown when dried. This combination of features is diagnostic for many species in the genus Psychotria, though not for any individual species. These features distinguish Psychotria L. Subg. Psychotria; other subgenera of Psychotria lack the well developed reddish brown trichomes inserted above the stipule scars. On the upper stems of P. viridis these features are obscured by a stipule (see below), which covers the trichomes; the scar actually marks the point where this structure has fallen off.

=== Stipules ===
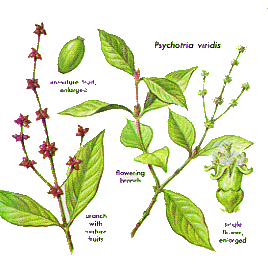
Psychotria viridis

Stipules are leafy structures that cover and protect the young developing leaves. They may persist or fall off, leaving scars on the stem. The stipules in P. viridis are produced in pairs and their form is distinctive. They are 5–25 mm (0.20–0.98 in) by 4–12 mm (0.16–0.47 in), elliptic in outline, sharply angled at the apex, papery to membranaceous in texture, ciliate (i.e., fringed) along the upper margins, and longitudinally flanged or winged along the middle.

=== Leaves ===
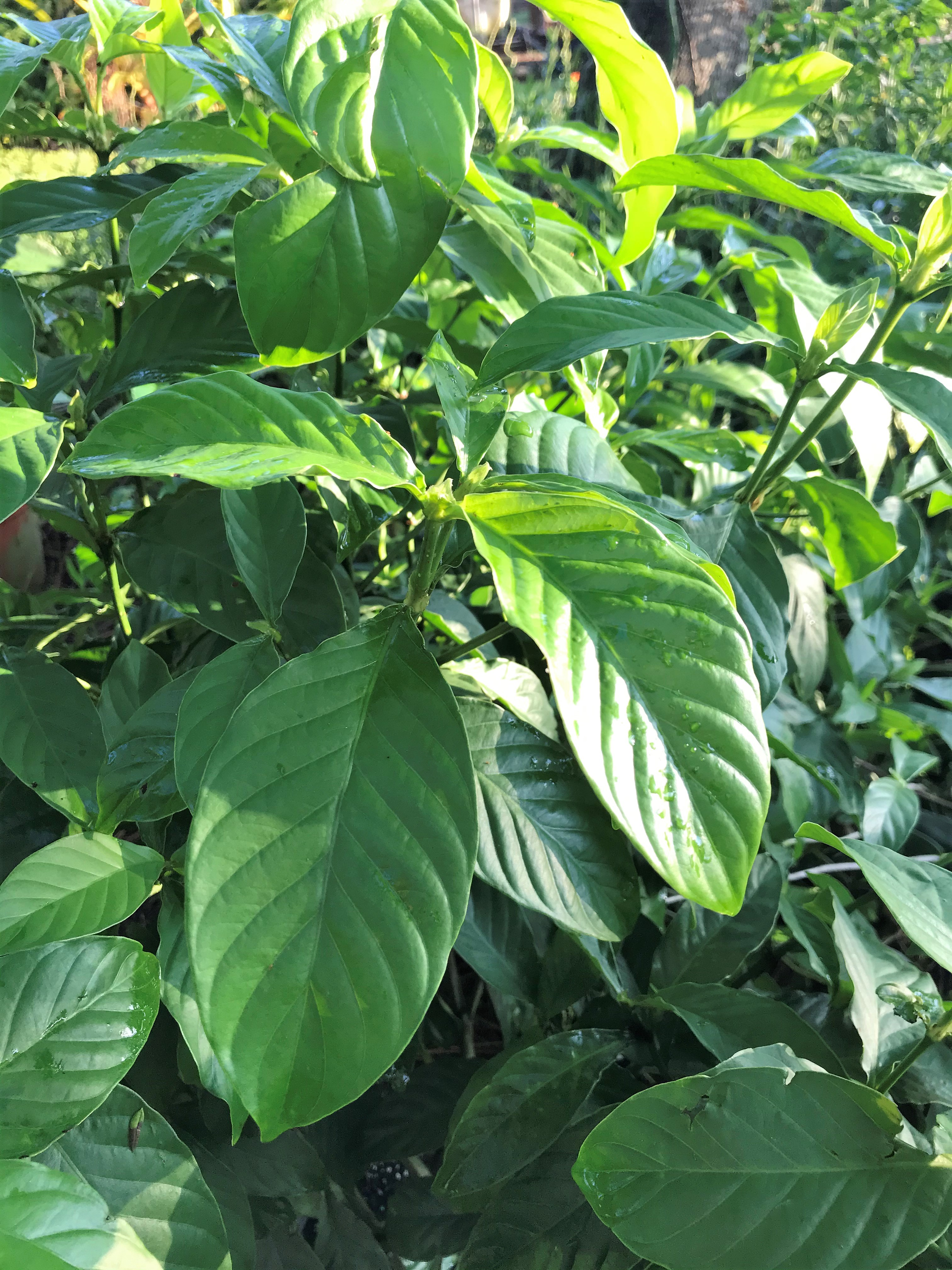
Psychotria viridis leaves

Leaves are opposite in arrangement (i.e., produced in pairs along the stems), generally 5–15 cm (2.0–5.9 in) by 2–6 cm (0.79–2.36 in), in outline generally elliptic or often widest above the middle, usually sharply angled at base and apex, papery in texture, overall smooth or infrequently with microscopic plant hairs on the lower surface, have 5–10 pairs of secondary veins, and on the lower surface usually have foveolae (see next item). The leaves are borne on petioles (i.e., leaf stalks) generally 1–10 mm (0.039–0.394 in) long. When dry, the leaves of Psychotria viridis usually are gray or reddish brown and are similar to those of a few other New World species of Psychotria.

=== Foveolae ===
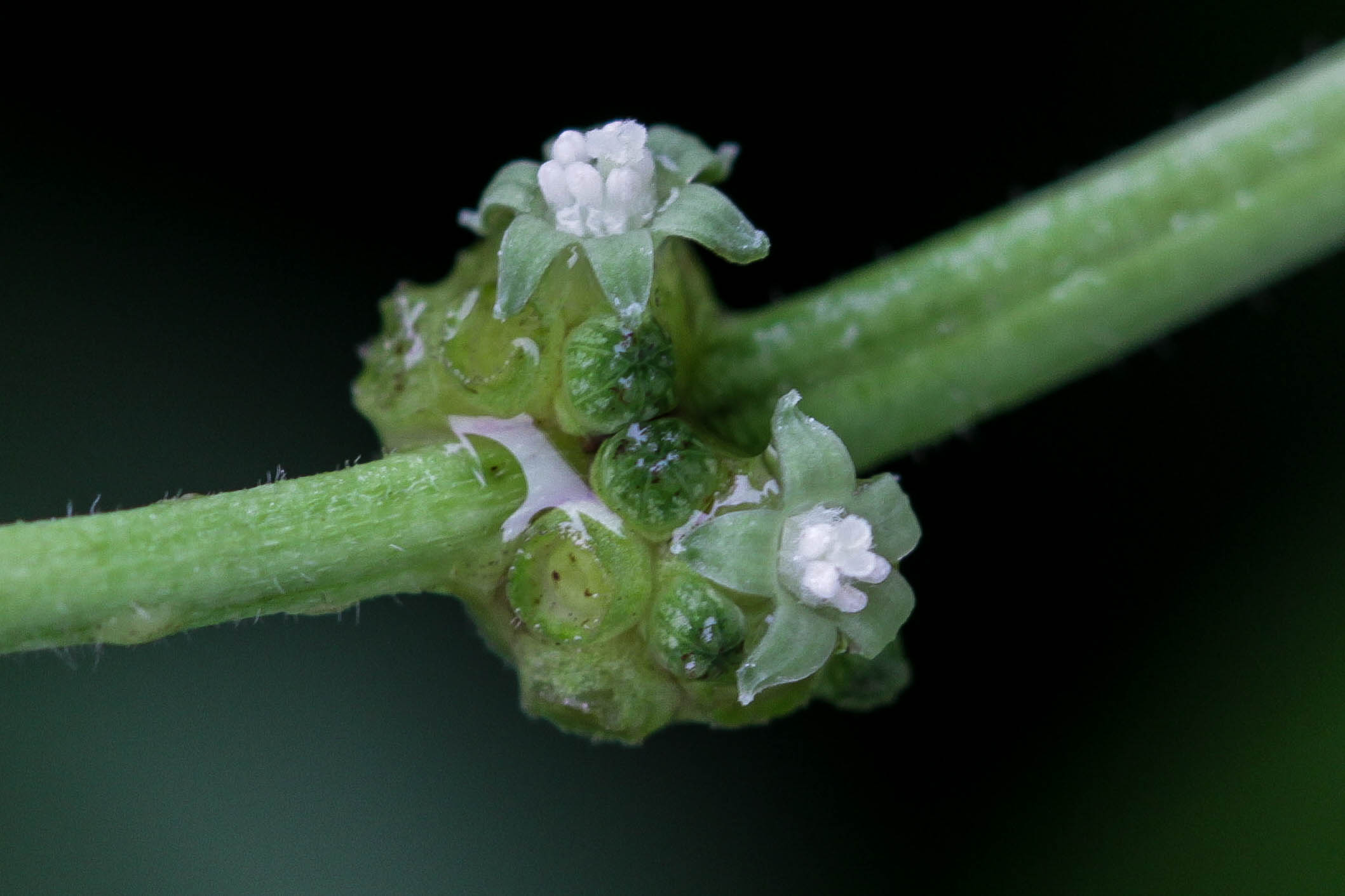
Psychotria viridis flower.

These are small pockets found on the lower leaf surface near the junction of the secondary (i.e., side) veins with the central vein. They function as shelter for tiny invertebrates such as mites that live on the plant leaf. These mites apparently often are symbiotic with the plant, taking shelter in these structures and eating fungi and herbivorous invertebrates that can damage the leaf. The foveolae (also called domatia) are distinctive for Psychotria viridis and a few related species: They are generally 1.5–5 mm (0.059–0.197 in) long and 0.5–1 mm (0.020–0.039 in) wide at the top, conical and tapered to a closed base, open and truncate or variously ornamented at the top, and situated along the sides of the central vein with the opening usually near a secondary vein. These foveolae vary in shape among different plants, and in number on individual leaves, and may not even be present on some leaves. Most often each leaf bears at least one pair of foveolae, which may be close to the apex; the foveolae are often more numerous on leaves from vegetative stems than on those from reproductive stems.

The leaves differ from Psychotria carthagenensis in having leaf edges that extend all the way to the base of the leaf stem.

== Cultivation ==
Psychotria viridis is hardy in USDA zone 10 or higher.

Cultivation from cuttings is easiest. A single leaf (or even part of a leaf slightly covered with soil) can be sufficient for a cutting. Propagation from seed is reliable and easy when freshly harvested seed is used. Older seed which has not been stored properly can have a very low germination rate after 6 months. Even while fresh, because P. viridis has an immature embryo, the germination process can take 2–6 months. There are approximately 50 seeds/g.

Indoor hydroponic cultivation of Psychotria viridis requires a light cycle. The plant will not utilize its root system as often in daylight hours. Optimal water garden pH is 5.5 to 6.1. The level of nutrient in the solution should be 300 to 500 parts per million (ppm). Nutrient solution burning can occur at levels as low as 800 ppm.

== Alkaloids ==
Dried P. viridis contains approximately 0.3% dimethyltryptamine (DMT). Other alkaloids such as beta-carbolines and N-methyltryptamine (NMT) have been found. The alkaloid content is said to be highest in the morning (approx 6am), although there is another peak at night (approx. 6pm).

== Traditional medicine ==
The Machiguenga people of Peru use juice from the leaves as eye drops to treat migraine headaches.

== Entheogen ==
P. viridis contains the hallucinogenic—or entheogenic—indole alkaloid dimethyltryptamine (DMT); the leaves contain 0.1 to 0.61% N,N-DMT along with traces of MMT and MTHC. It is known primarily as an additive to the ayahuasca brew used in South and Central America. The mechanism of action is via the monoamine oxidase inhibitor (MAOI) present in Banisteriopsis caapi, which allows ayahuasca to be effective in oral doses (unlike smoking DMT crystals which requires no conditioning partner substance). This use was made legal in Brazil in 1992 when B. caapi, P. viridis, and the ayahuasca tea were exempted from the list of illicit drugs.

Vegetalistas, healers in the Amazon regions of Peru, Ecuador, and Colombia, recognize different sub-varieties of Psychotria viridis, based on the location of glands on the back of the leaves.

== Hybridisation ==
P. viridis has been hybridised with the closely related species, Psychotria carthagenensis. In 2008, Darren Williams, an Australian nurseryman and scientist, created the first recorded interspecific hybrid of Psychotria viridis, by crossing P. carthagenensis with P. viridis. This plant was multiplied and sold as Psychotria cv. Nexus by the nursery Herbalistics, located in Australia, which was established in 2003 and run by Mr. Williams. By creating an interspecific hybrid of these two Ayahuasca plants, the climatic tolerance of this important Ayahuasca additive has been expanded due to the greater cold tolerance of P. carthagenensis. Darren Williams has now created over 150 new cultivars by intercrossing P. viridis accessions, backcrossing and sib crossing, resulting in various new genotypes, given the prefix DW, eg. DW07. Leaf shape and size, height, alkaloid content and cold tolerance are examples of new attributes. Psychotria cv. Nexus is now grown in many countries around the world.

== See also ==
- Psychedelic plants
