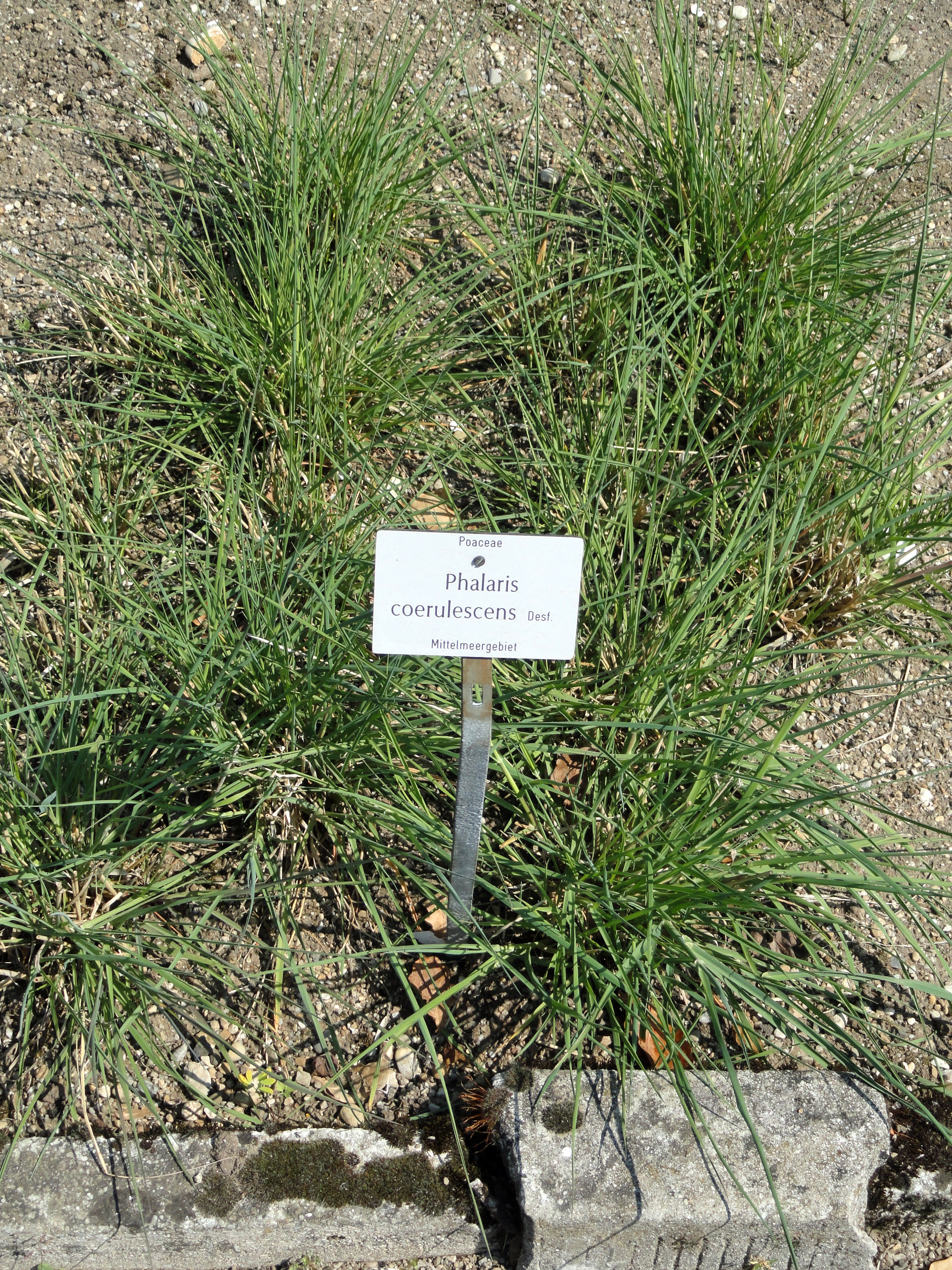

Scientific classification
- Kingdom: Plantae
- Clade: Tracheophytes
- Clade: Angiosperms
- Clade: Monocots
- Clade: Commelinids
- Order: Poales
- Family: Poaceae
- Subfamily: Pooideae
- Genus: Phalaris
- Species: P. coerulescens

Binomial name
- Phalaris coerulescens Desf.

= Phalaris coerulescens =

Species of grass

Phalaris coerulescens, the sunolgrass, is a plant in the family Poaceae.
