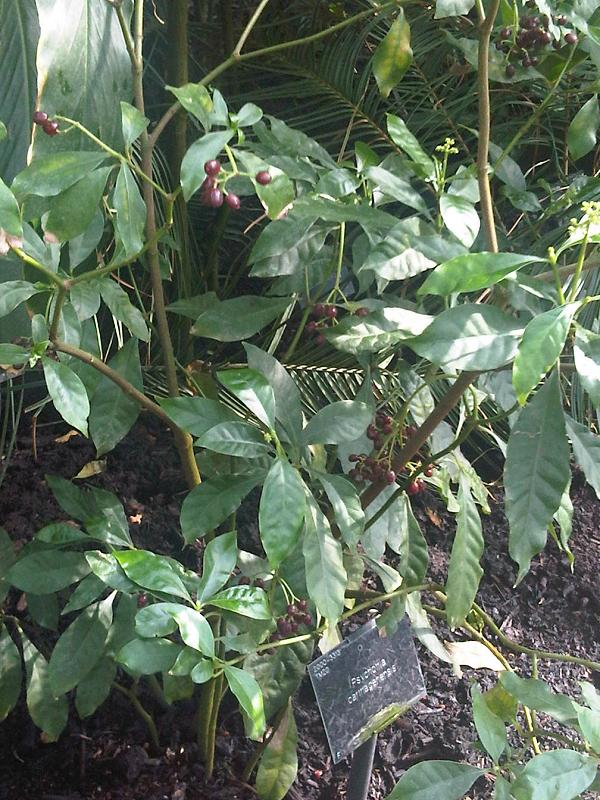

Scientific classification
- Kingdom: Plantae
- Clade: Embryophytes
- Clade: Tracheophytes
- Clade: Spermatophytes
- Clade: Angiosperms
- Clade: Eudicots
- Clade: Asterids
- Order: Gentianales
- Family: Rubiaceae
- Genus: Psychotria
- Species: P. carthagenensis

Binomial name
- Psychotria carthagenensis Jacq.

Synonyms
- Psychotria carthaginensis (lapsus); Psychotria alba

= Psychotria carthagenensis =

Species of plant

External image
- Photos

Psychotria carthagenensis, also known as amyruca, is a South American rainforest understory shrub from the coffee family, Rubiaceae. It grows from the tropics of South America to Mexico.

The plant is used in the preparation of the ayahuasca decoction.

== Pharmacological studies ==
A study in 1972 based in gas chromatography–mass spectrometry method determined the presence of the alkaloids dimethyltryptamine (DMT), N-methyltryptamine (MMT), and 2-methyl-1,2,3,4-tetrahydro-β-carboline (MTHC) in the leaves.

In a study in 1994 on ethanol extracts of the leaves showed negative results for the presence of alkaloids. Later, a phytochemical analysis in 2022 on aqueous extracts of the leaves demonstrated the presences of alkaloids.

== Hybridisation ==
Psychotria carthagenensis has been hybridised with the closely related P. viridis, by Australian nurseryman and scientist Darren Williams. The cultivar Nexus was created in 2008, sold by the nursery Herbalistics, resulting in a plant with greater cold tolerance, increased growth rate.

== See also ==
- Psychoactive plants
