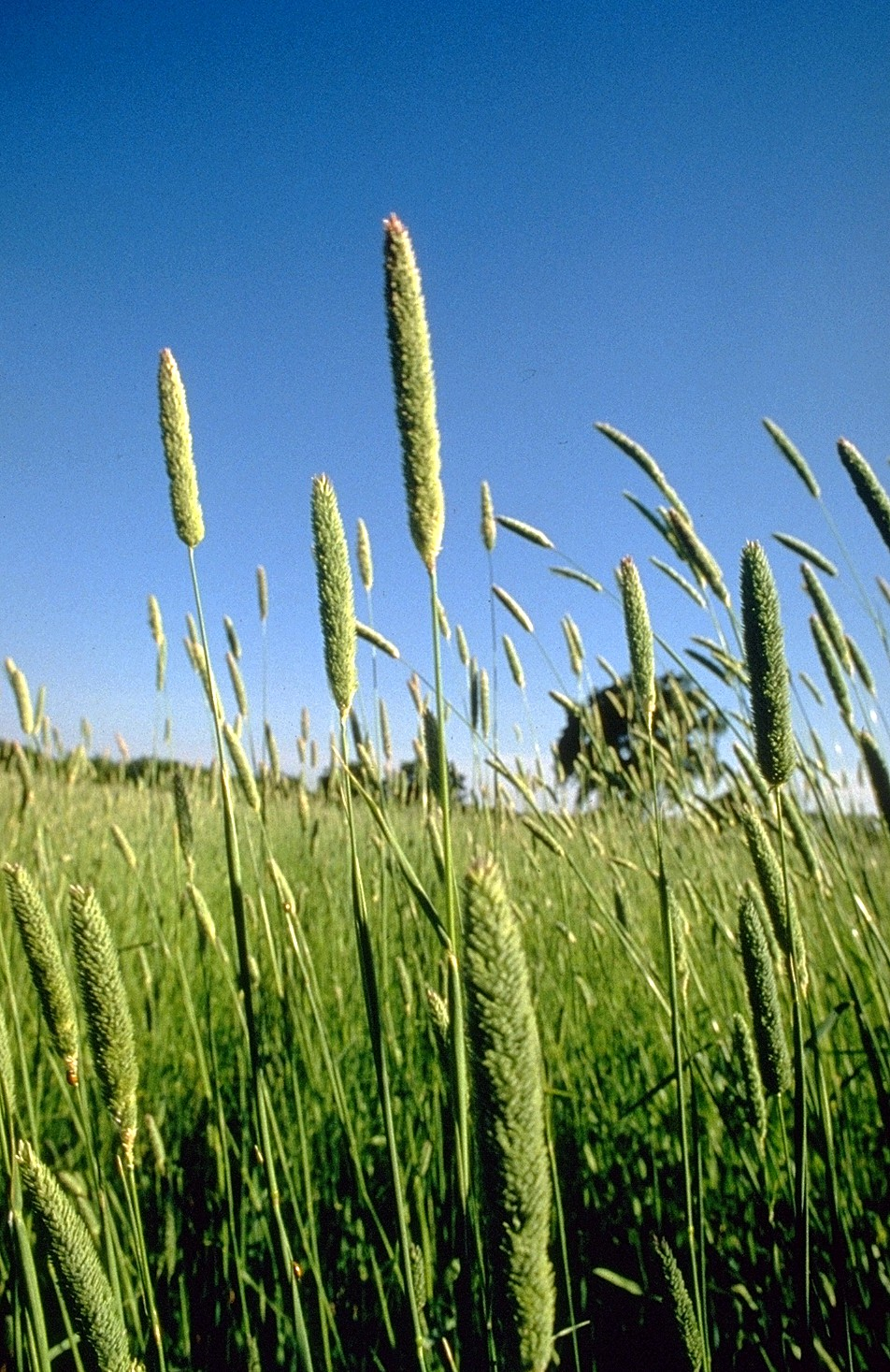
- Phalaris aquatica

Scientific classification
- Kingdom: Plantae
- Clade: Embryophytes
- Clade: Tracheophytes
- Clade: Angiosperms
- Clade: Monocots
- Clade: Commelinids
- Order: Poales
- Family: Poaceae
- Subfamily: Pooideae
- Supertribe: Poodae
- Tribe: Poeae
- Subtribe: Phalaridinae; Fr.
- Genus: Phalaris; L.

Species
- 15-22 species (see text)

= Phalaris (plant) =

Genus of flowering plant in the grass family

Phalaris is a genus of flowering plants in the grass family. Species of Phalaris are distributed across all continents except Antarctica. They can be found in a broad range of habitats from below sea level to thousands of feet above sea level and from wet marshy areas to dry places. P. arundinacea and P. aquatica are sometimes invasive species in wetlands.

== Alkaloids ==
Several Phalaris species—notably Phalaris aquatica and Phalaris arundinacea—produce bioactive indole alkaloids, including DMT, 5-MeO-DMT, bufotenin, gramine, tyramines and trace β-carbolines.

Reported alkaloid profile in select Phalaris species
| Species | Total alkaloids (dry weight) | Primary alkaloids |
|---|---|---|
| Phalaris aquatica | 0.0007–0.18% | DMT, 5-MeO-DMT, 5-OH-DMT |
| Phalaris arundinacea | 0.0004–0.121% | Gramine, DMT, 5-MeO-DMT |
| Phalaris brachystachys | Up to 3.0% | DMT |

== Toxicity ==
Grazing on Phalaris-dominated pastures can cause livestock toxicoses:

- Phalaris staggers: A chronic neurological condition associated with ruminants grazing Phalaris containing toxic alkaloids; appropriate cobalt supplementation can reduce the risk of the staggers syndrome.
- Sudden death: Acute mortality caused by peracute ammonia toxicity from young shoot consumption; not preventable by cobalt.

Low-alkaloid cultivars are widely used to reduce grazing risk.

== Uses ==
Phalaris species, particularly Phalaris aquatica and Phalaris arundinacea, are widely cultivated as forage and pasture fodder for livestock. Canary seed (Phalaris canariensis) is commercially grown as bird food and consumed as human food in certain regions. In non-clinical and in vitro research, seed extracts and biopeptides from P. canariensis have been investigated for potential antioxidant, antihypertensive, antidiabetic, anti-inflammatory, and antimicrobial properties.

== Species ==
Species include:

- Phalaris amethystina Trin.
- Phalaris angusta – timothy canarygrass
- Phalaris aquatica – bulbous canarygrass, Harding grass, Hardinggrass (syn. Phalaris tuberosa)
- Phalaris arundinacea – reed canary grass, reed canarygrass
- Phalaris brachystachys – shortspike canarygrass
- Phalaris californica – California canarygrass
- Phalaris canariensis – annual canarygrass, common canary grass, common canarygrass
- Phalaris caroliniana – Carolina canarygrass, maygrass, see Eastern Agricultural Complex
- Phalaris coerulescens – sunolgrass
- Phalaris commutata
- Phalaris elongata Braun-Blanq.
- Phalaris lemmonii – Lemmon's canarygrass
- Phalaris minor – canarygrass, littleseed canarygrass
- Phalaris paradoxa – hood canarygrass
- Phalaris platensis Henrard ex Wacht.
- Phalaris truncata Guss. ex Bertol.
