= Gramine =

- Chemical structure of gramine

Names
- Preferred IUPAC name 1-(1H-Indol-3-yl)-N,N-dimethylmethanamine
- Other names donaxine

Identifiers
CAS Number	87-52-5
3D model (JSmol)	Interactive image
ChEBI	CHEBI:28948
ChEMBL	ChEMBL254348
ChemSpider	6625
ECHA InfoCard	100.001.591
EC Number	201-749-8
KEGG	C08304
PubChem CID	6890
UNII	FGQ8A78L14
CompTox Dashboard (EPA)	DTXSID3058955
- InChI: InChI=1S/C11H14N2/c1-13(2)8-9-7-12-11-6-4-3-5-10(9)11/h3-7,12H,8H2,1-2H3 Key: OCDGBSUVYYVKQZ-UHFFFAOYSA-N; InChI=1/C11H14N2/c1-13(2)8-9-7-12-11-6-4-3-5-10(9)11/h3-7,12H,8H2,1-2H3 Key: OCDGBSUVYYVKQZ-UHFFFAOYAK
- SMILES: c1cccc2c1c(c[nH]2)CN(C)C

Properties
Chemical formula	C_{11}H_{14}N_{2}
Molar mass	174.24 g/mol
Melting point	138 to 139 °C (280 to 282 °F; 411 to 412 K)

Hazards
NFPA 704 (fire diamond)	2 1 0
- Except where otherwise noted, data are given for materials in their standard state (at 25 °C [77 °F], 100 kPa). verify (what is ?) Infobox references

Gramine (also called donaxine) is a naturally occurring indole alkaloid present in several plant species. Gramine may play a defensive role in these plants, since it is toxic to many organisms.

== Occurrence ==
Gramine has been found in the giant reed, Arundo donax, Acer saccharinum (Silver Maple), Hordeum, (a grass genus that includes barley) and Phalaris (another grass genus).

== Effects and toxicity ==
Gramine is a close analogue of the psychedelic drug dimethyltryptamine (DMT), but its side chain has one less carbon atom in comparison. In contrast to DMT, gramine does not have significant psychedelic-like behavioral effects in animals. The same is true of 5-methoxygramine (5-MeO-gramine), which failed to substitute for DOM in rodent drug discrimination tests. The N,N-didesmethyl analogue of gramine, indolemethylamine (3-aminomethylindole), showed 71-fold reduced potency as a serotonin receptor agonist compared to tryptamine in the rat stomach strip.

Gramine has been found to act as an agonist of the adiponectin receptor 1 (AdipoR1).

The LD50 of gramine is 44.6 mg/ kg iv in mice and 62.9 mg/ kg iv in rats. Numerous studies have been done on the toxicity of gramine and tryptamines to insects harmful to crops in order to assess their potential use as an insecticide.

Recent toxicity evaluations show Gramine to be relatively low toxicity in humans, and to have anti-mutagenic and potential neuroprotective action, as a widely found alkaloid present in oats and barley.

== See also ==
- Dimethyltryptamine (DMT)
- Dimethylhomotryptamine (DMHT)
