= List of psychedelic literature =

This is a list of psychedelic literature, works related to psychedelic drugs and the psychedelic experience. Psychedelic literature has also been defined as textual works that arose from the proliferation of psychiatric and psychotherapeutic research with hallucinogens during the 1950s and early 1960s in North America and Europe.

== Science ==
Author	Title	Published
Alexandre Rouhier	Le Peyotl: La Plante Qui Fait les Yeux Émerveillés	1927
Stanislav Grof	LSD Psychotherapy: The Healing Potential of Psychedelic Medicine	1975
O. T. Oss and O. N. Oeric (Terence and Dennis McKenna)	Psilocybin: Magic Mushroom Grower's Guide	1976
Joan Halifax	The Human Encounter With Death	1977
Peter Stafford	Psychedelics Encyclopedia	1977, 1983, 1992
Edward F. Anderson	Peyote: The Divine Cactus	1980
Stanislav Grof, Christina Grof	Beyond Death: The Gates of Consciousness	1981
Albert Most (Ken Nelson)	Bufo Alvarius: the Psychedelic Toad of the Sonoran Desert	1984
Stanislav Grof	Beyond the Brain: Birth, Death, and Transcendence in Psychotherapy	1985
Stanislav Grof, Hal Zina Bennet	The Holotropic Mind: The Three levels of Human Consciousness and How They Shape Our Lives	1992
Jonathan Ott	Pharmacotheon: Entheogenic Drugs, Their Plant Sources and History	1993/1996
Nicholas Saunders	E for Ecstasy	1993
Myron Stolaroff	The Secret Chief	1997
Stanislav Grof	The Cosmic Game: Explorations of the Frontiers of Human Consciousness	1998
Rick Strassman	DMT: The Spirit Molecule	2000
Daniel Pinchbeck	Breaking Open the Head: A Psychedelic Journey into the Heart of Contemporary Shamanism	2003
Peter Stafford	Psychedelics	2003
Stanislav Grof	When the Impossible Happens: Adventures in Non-ordinary Realities	2006
James Fadiman	The Psychedelic Explorer’s Guide: Safe, Therapeutic, and Sacred Journeys	2011
Michael Pollan	How to Change Your Mind: What the New Science of Psychedelics Teaches Us About Consciousness, Dying, Addiction, Depression, and Transcendence	2018
Mike Jay	Mescaline: A Global History of the First Psychedelic	2019
Rachel Nuwer	I Feel Love: MDMA and the Quest for Connection in a Fractured World	2023

== Chemistry ==
Author	Title	Published
Michael Valentine Smith	Psychedelic Chemistry	1973/1981
Alexander Shulgin, Ann Shulgin	PiHKAL (Phenethylamines I Have Known and Loved: A Chemical Love Story)	1991
Alexander Shulgin, Ann Shulgin	TiHKAL (Tryptamines I Have Known and Loved: The Continuation)	1997
Daniel Trachsel, Nicolas Richard	Psychedelische Chemie: Aspekte Psychoaktiver Moleküle (Psychedelic Chemistry: Aspects of Psychoactive Molecules)	2000–2016
Alexander Shulgin, Tania Manning, and Paul F. Daley	The Shulgin Index, Volume One: Psychedelic Phenethylamines and Related Compounds	2011
Daniel Trachsel, David Lehmann, and Christoph Enzensperger	Phenethylamine: Von der Struktur zur Funktion (Phenethylamines: From Structure to Function)	2013

== Anthropology ==
Author	Title	Published
Peter T. Furst	Flesh of the Gods: The Ritual Use of Hallucinogens	1972
Peter T. Furst	Hallucinogens and Culture	1976
Allan D. Coult	Psychedelic Anthropology: The Study of Man Through the Manifestation of the Mind	1977
Richard Evans Schultes, Albert Hofmann	The Botany and Chemistry of Hallucinogens	1973/1980
Richard Evans Schultes, Albert Hofmann	Plants of the Gods: Origins of Hallucinogenic Use (subsequently retitled Plants of the Gods: Their Sacred, Healing, and Hallucinogenic Powers)	1979/2001
Richard Evans Schultes	Vine of the Soul: Medicine Men, Their Plants and Rituals in the Colombian Amazonia	1984
Jeremy Narby	The Cosmic Serpent: DNA and the Origins of Knowledge	1988
Christian Rätsch	The Encyclopedia of Psychoactive Plants: Ethnopharmacology and Its Applications (Enzyklopädie der Psychoaktiven Pflanzen: Botanik, Ethnopharmakologie und Anwendung)	1998/2005
Dale Pendell	Pharmako/Gnosis	2005
John A. Rush	Entheogens and the Development of Culture: The Anthropology and Neurobiology of Ecstatic Experience	2013
Beatriz Caiuby Labate, Clancy Cavnar	Plant Medicines, Healing and Psychedelic Science: Cultural Perspectives	2018
Mike Marinacci	Psychedelic Cults and Outlaw Churches	2023

== Subjective effects ==
Author	Title	Published
Kurt Beringer	Der Meskalinrausch, seine Geschichte und Erscheinungsweise (Mescaline Intoxication, its History and Manifestation)	1927
Heinrich Klüver	Mescal: The Divine Plant and Its Psychological Effects	1928
Aldous Huxley	The Doors of Perception	1954
Aldous Huxley	Heaven and Hell	1956
Alan Watts	Joyous Cosmology	1962
William S. Burroughs, Allen Ginsberg	The Yage Letters	1963
Carlos Castaneda	The Teachings of Don Juan: A Yaqui Way of Knowledge	1968
John C. Lilly	Programming and Metaprogramming in the Human Biocomputer	1968
John C. Lilly	The Center of the Cyclone	1972
Aldous Huxley	Moksha: Writings on Psychedelics & the Visionary Experience	1977
Albert Hofmann	LSD: My Problem Child (LSD – Mein Sorgenkind)	1979/1980
Terence McKenna	True Hallucinations	1993
John C. Lilly	The Scientist: A Novel Autobiography	1996
Don Lattin	The Harvard Psychedelic Club	2010
Tao Lin	Trip: Psychedelics, Alienation, and Change	2018

== Political possibilities ==
Author	Title	Published
Martin A. Lee	Acid Dreams: The CIA, LSD and the Sixties Rebellion (Acid Dreams: The Complete Social History of LSD: the CIA, the Sixties, and Beyond)	1985
Ben Sessa	To Fathom Hell or Soar Angelic	2015

== Inspired by psychedelic experience ==
Author	Title	Published
Ernst Jünger	Visit to Godenholm	1952
Aldous Huxley	Island	1962
Timothy Leary, Ralph Metzner, Richard Alpert	The Psychedelic Experience: A Manual Based on the Tibetan Book of the Dead	1964
Philip K. Dick	The Three Stigmata of Palmer Eldritch	1965
Tom Wolfe	The Electric Kool-Aid Acid Test	1968
Baba Ram Dass (Richard Alpert)	Be Here Now	1971
Thaddeus Golas	The Lazy Man's Guide to Enlightenment	1971
Hunter S. Thompson	Fear and Loathing in Las Vegas	1971
Duncan Fallowell	Satyrday	1986
Terence McKenna	Food of the Gods: the Search for the Original Tree of Knowledge	1992
Donald Dunbar	Eyelid Lick	2012
William Leonard Pickard	The Rose of Paracelsus: On Secrets & Sacraments	2015

== Periodicals ==
=== Psychedelic magazines ===
- DoubleBlind Mag
- Dragibus Magazine
- The Entheogen Review
- High Frontiers
- High Times
- Psychedelic Magazine
- Psychedelic Monographs and Essays

=== Academic journals ===
- British Journal of Psychiatry
- Drugs and Alcohol Review
- Drugs and Alcohol Today
- Drug Science, Policy and Law
- Harm Reduction Journal
- International Journal of Drug Policy
- Journal of Drug Issues
- Journal of European Neuropsychopharmacology
- Journal of Psychopharmacology
- Therapeutic Advances in Psychopharmacology

== Publishers ==
- Inner Traditions – Bear & Company
- Psychedelic Press
- Synergetic Press
- Transform Press

== See also ==
- List of books and publications related to the hippie subculture
- List of psychedelic documentaries
- List of New Age topics
- Psychedelic art
- Psychedelic film
- List of psychedelic journals
- List of psychedelic news and media organizations
- Erowid
