= Plants of the Gods =

1979 book about psychoactive plants and fungi

- Cover of the 2001 expanded edition
- Author: Richard Evans Schultes and Albert Hofmann (also later Christian Rätsch)
- Original title: Plants of the Gods: Origins of Hallucinogenic Use (1979)
- Working title: Plants of the Gods: Their Sacred, Healing, and Hallucinogenic Powers (1992/2001); Pflanzen der Götter: die magischen Kräfte der bewußtseinserweiternden Gewächse (1998)
- Translator: Christian Rätsch
- Language: English; German
- Subject: Psychoactive plants and fungi
- Genre: Non-fiction
- Publisher: McGraw-Hill, AT Verlag/Healing Arts Press
- Publication date: 1979 (also 1998 and 2001)
- Publication place: New York/Aarau/Rochester
- Pages: 192 (1979); 208 (2001)
- ISBN: 978-0-07-056089-5 (1979)
- OCLC: 6190695
- LC Class: 79013382
- Website: 1st ed. (1979); 2nd ed. (2001)

Plants of the Gods is a 1979 book about psychoactive plants and fungi written by the American ethnobotanist Richard Evans Schultes and the Swiss chemist Albert Hofmann. It was originally titled Plants of the Gods: Origins of Hallucinogenic Use with the first 1979 edition, but was subsequently retitled Plants of the Gods: Their Sacred, Healing, and Hallucinogenic Powers with a 1992 reprint. The book was later expanded, revised, and translated into German by the German anthropologist Christian Rätsch with the title Pflanzen der Götter: die magischen Kräfte der bewußtseinserweiternden Gewächse in 1998. A few years afterwards, this edition was translated back into English with the title Plants of the Gods: Their Sacred, Healing, and Hallucinogenic Powers in 2001.

The book features introductory sections on botany, chemistry, and geography of psychoactive plants; a "Plant Lexicon" with single-column entries for 91 species; a 14-page table with the 91 species and sections on scientific names, history, ethnography, context and purpose of use, preparation, phytochemistry, and pharmacology; more-in-depth short chapters on "Fourteen Major Hallucinogenic Plants" that make up the bulk of the book; chapters on chemistry and medicine; and further reading and index sections. The fourteen chapters specifically review Amanita muscaria, various deliriant plants (Atropa, Hyoscyamus, and Mandragora species), Cannabis species, Claviceps purpurea (ergot), Datura species, Tabernanthe iboga (iboga), Anadenanthera species, Banisteriopsis species, Brugmansia species (angel's trumpets), Lophophora williamsii (peyote), Psilocybe and other psilocybin mushroom species, Trichocereus pachanoi (San Pedro), morning glory (Ipomoea violacea and Turbina corymbosa), and Virola species. It has many photographs, figures, and illustrations. The book was originally dedicated to Heinrich Klüver, though this was removed in later editions. It is said to be geared toward laypersons as opposed to a technical audience and has been said to be a "coffee-table" book.

Plants of the Gods has been translated into German, Spanish, and French. Subsequent to the original edition, Christian Rätsch revised and expanded the book, with this edition being published in German in 1998 and in English in 2001. The most major change was the addition of many new photographs and psychedelic art images, with many low-quality, black-and-white images, and drawings rather than photographs being replaced. Some of Rätsch's own art was featured in the book. The section with chapters on major hallucinogenic plants was renamed "The Most Important Hallucinogenic Plants" and new chapters on Anadenanthera colubrina, ayahuasca analogs, Salvia divinorum (diviner's sage), and Duboisia hopwoodii (pituri) were added along with expansions of the existing chapters. Six new species were additionally added to the "Plant Lexicon", for a total of 97 species. The book's number of pages increased from 192 in the original edition to 208 with Rätsch's expansion.

Plants of the Gods was preceded by Schultes and Hofmann's longer and more technical and academic book The Botany and Chemistry of Hallucinogens (1973; second edition 1980). Subsequently, it was followed by Christian Rätsch's Enzyklopädie der Psychoaktiven Pflanzen: Botanik, Ethnopharmakologie und Anwendung (The Encyclopedia of Psychoactive Plants: Ethnopharmacology and Its Applications) (1998; English translation 2005).

The book's various editions have been reviewed by authors such as Jonathan Ott and Jon Hanna. It has been referred to by Ott as a "classic" text on psychoactive plants and fungi. In addition, Rätsch's expanded version has been described by Hanna as a "thing of beauty", a "truly a marvelous work", a "visual delight", and a "joy to read cover-to-cover".

== List of Plant Lexicon species ==
1. Acacia maidenii (maiden's acacia)
2. Acorus calamus (sweet flag)
3. Amanita muscaria (fly agaric)
4. Anadenanthera colubrina (cebil, vilca)
5. Anadenanthera peregrina (yopo)
6. Argyreia nervosa (Hawaiian wood rose)
7. Ariocarpus retusus (false peyote)
8. Atropa belladonna (deadly nightshade)
9. Banisteriopsis caapi (ayahuasca)
10. Boletus manicus (kuma mushroom)
11. Brugmansia aurea (golden angel's trumpet)
12. Brugmansia sanguinea (blood-red angel's trumpet)
13. Brunfelsia grandiflora (brunfelsia)
14. Cacalia cordifolia (matwu)
15. Caesalpinia sepiaria (Yun-Shih)
16. Calea zacatechichi (dog grass)
17. Cannabis sativa (cannabis, marijuana, hemp)
18. Carnegiea gigantea (saguaro)
19. Cestrum parqui (lady of the night)
20. Claviceps purpurea (ergot)
21. Coleus blumei (painted nettle)
22. Conocybe siligineoides (conocybe)
23. Coriaria thymifolia (shanshi)
24. Coryphantha compacta (pincushion cactus)
25. Cymbopogon densiflorus (lemongrass)
26. Cytisus canariensis (genista)
27. Datura innoxia (toloache)
28. Datura metel (datura)
29. Datura stramonium (thorn apple)
30. Desfontainia spinosa (taique)
31. Duboisia hopwoodii (pituri bush)
32. Echinocereus triglochidiatus (pitallito cactus)
33. Epithelantha micromeris (hikuli mulato)
34. Erythrina americana (coral tree)
35. Galbulimima belgraveana (agara)
36. Heimia salicifolia (sinicuichi)
37. Helichrysum spp. (straw flower) (e.g., H. foetidum)
38. Helicostylis pedunculata (takini)
39. Homalomena lauterbachii (ereriba)
40. Hyoscyamus albus (yellow henbane)
41. Hyoscyamus niger (black henbane)
42. Iochroma fuchsioides (paguando)
43. Ipomoea violacea (morning glory)
44. Justicia pectoralis (mashihiri)
45. Kaempferia galanga (galanga)
46. Lagochilus inebrians (Turkestan mint)
47. Latua pubiflora (latue)
48. Leonotis leonurus (lion's tail)
49. Leonurus sibiricus (Siberian motherwort)
50. Lobelia tupa (tabaco del diablo)
51. Lophophora williamsii (peyote)
52. Lycoperdon spp. (bovista) (e.g., L. mixtecorum, L. marginatum)
53. Mammillaria spp. (pincushion cactus) (e.g., M. heyderii, M. craigii, M. grahamii)
54. Mandragora officinarum (mandrake)
55. Maquira sclerophylla (rapé dos Indios)
56. Mimosa hostilis (jurema tree)
57. Mitragyna speciosa (kratom)
58. Mucuna pruriens (cowhage)
59. Myristica fragrans (nutmeg)
60. Nymphaea ampla (water lily)
61. Oncidium cebolleta (hikuri orchid)
62. Pachycereus pecten-aboriginum (cawe)
63. Panaeolus cyanescens (blue meanies)
64. Panaeolus sphinctrinus (hoop-petticoat)
65. Panaeolus subbalteatus (dark-rimmed mottlegill)
66. Pancratium trianthum (kwashi)
67. Pandanus spp. (screw pine)
68. Peganum harmala (Syrian rue)
69. Pelecyphora aselliformis (peyotillo)
70. Pernettya furens (hierba loca)
71. Petunia violacea (shanin)
72. Peucedanum japonicum (Fang-K'uei)
73. Phalaris arundinacea (red canary grass)
74. Phragmites australis (common reed)
75. Phytolacca acinosa (pokeberry)
76. Psilocybe cubensis (San Isidro)
77. Psilocybe cyanescens (wavy cap)
78. Psilocybe mexicana (teonanácatl)
79. Psilocybe semilanceata (liberty cap)
80. Psychotria viridis (chacruna)
81. Rhynchosia phaseoloides (piule)
82. Salvia divinorum (diviner's sage)
83. Sceletium tortuosum (kanna)
84. Scirpus atrovirens (bakana)
85. Scopolia carniolica (scopolia)
86. Sida acuta (axocatzín)
87. Solandra grandiflora (chalice vine)
88. Sophora secundiflora (mescal bean)
89. Tabernaemontana spp. (sanango) (e.g., T. sananho)
90. Tabernanthe iboga (iboga)
91. Tagetes lucida (yauhtli)
92. Tanaecium nocturnum (koribo)
93. Tetrapteris methystica (caapi-pinima)
94. Trichocereus pachanoi (San Pedro cactus)
95. Turbina corymbosa (ololiuqui)
96. Virola theiodora (cumala tree)
97. Voacanga spp. (voacanga) (e.g., V. africana, V. grandiflora)

== See also ==
- Psychoactive plant
- List of psychedelic literature
- List of psychoactive plants
- List of psychoactive plants, fungi, and animals
- List of substances used in rituals
- The Botany and Chemistry of Hallucinogens (1973/1980)
- The Encyclopedia of Psychoactive Plants (2005)
- Pharmacotheon (1993/1996)
