= The Encyclopedia of Psychoactive Plants =

1998 book

- Cover of the 2005 English translation
- Author: Christian Rätsch
- Original title: Enzyklopädie der Psychoaktiven Pflanzen: Botanik, Ethnopharmakologie und Anwendungen
- Working title: The Encyclopedia of Psychoactive Plants: Ethnopharmacology and Its Applications
- Translator: John Baker
- Language: English, German
- Subject: Psychoactive plants and fungi
- Genre: Non-fiction
- Publisher: AT Verlag/Wissenschaftliche Verlagsgesellschaft (German), Park Street Press (English)
- Publication date: 1998
- Publication place: Aarau/Stuttgart (German); Rochester, VT (English)
- English publication date: 2005
- Pages: 941 (German), 942 (English)
- ISBN: 978-0892819782 (English)
- Followed by: Enzyklopädie der Psychoaktiven Pflanzen – Band 2: Neue Pflanzen, Pilze, Bakterien. Anwendung. Kulturgeschichte (Encyclopedia of Psychoactive Plants – Volume 2: New Plants, Fungi, Bacteria. Usage. Cultural History (2022)
- Website: Publisher page Internet Archive

The Encyclopedia of Psychoactive Plants: Ethnopharmacology and Its Applications, also known in German as Enzyklopädie der Psychoaktiven Pflanzen: Botanik, Ethnopharmakologie und Anwendungen, is a book about psychoactive plants and fungi written by the German anthropologist Christian Rätsch. It was originally published in German in 1998 and was subsequently translated into English by John Baker in 2005. A second volume was published in 2022.

It is an encyclopedia of individual psychoactive plants and fungi, including sections on family, subspecies, synonyms, history, distribution, cultivation, appearance, psychoactive material, preparation and dosage, ritual use, medicinal use, constituents, effects, commercial forms and regulations, and literature references. The book is 941 pages and contains 454 entries on psychoactive plants and fungi. It features more than 800 photographs, mostly taken by Rätsch. The foreword was written by Albert Hofmann.

The book followed earlier works such as Richard Evans Schultes and Albert Hofmann's The Botany and Chemistry of Hallucinogens (1973) and Plants of the Gods: Origins of Hallucinogenic Use (1979). Notably, Rätsch himself had expanded, revised, and translated Schultes and Hofmann's Plants of the Gods into German with the title Pflanzen der Götter: die magischen Kräfte der bewußtseinserweiternden Gewächse in 1998, with this edition subsequently being translated back into English and published as Plants of the Gods: Their Sacred, Healing, and Hallucinogenic Powers in 2001. Besides its connection to the preceding works, Rätsch's The Encyclopedia of Psychoactive Plants has also been compared to Alexander Shulgin's PiHKAL: A Chemical Love Story (1991) and TiHKAL: The Continuation (1997), but reviewing psychoactive plants and fungi rather than psychedelic chemical compounds.

The book is said to be the first comprehensive academic work on psychoactive plants and fungi as well as the "ultimate reference work" on the subject and has been described as being Rätsch's magnum opus. It has been reviewed by various authors, including Jonathan Ott among others.

In 2022, Christian Rätsch and Markus Berger published a second volume titled Enzyklopädie der Psychoaktiven Pflanzen – Band 2: Neue Pflanzen, Pilze, Bakterien. Anwendung. Kulturgeschichte (Encyclopedia of Psychoactive Plants – Volume 2: New Plants, Fungi, Bacteria. Usage. Cultural History). It is 800 pages and contains over 500 new psychoactive plants, fungi, lichens, and bacteria across more than 140 entries. An additional 350 psychoactive plants yet to be explored are referenced in tables. Rätsch died 17 days after the publication of the second volume at the age of 65 due to a chronic stomach ulcer. With its publication, he expressed that his life's work was complete. An English translation of the book by John Baker was scheduled to be published in 2026.

== List of monographs ==
=== Major plant monographs ===
- Acacia spp.
- Aconitum ferox (blue aconite)
- Aconitum napellus (monkshood, blue rocket)
- Aconitum spp.
- Acorus calamus (calamus, sweet flag)
- Agave spp. (agaves, mezcal plants)
- Alstonia scholaris (dita tree)
- Anadenanthera colubrina (cebíl, villca)
- Anadenanthera peregrina (cohoba, yopo)
- Areca catechu (betel palm)
- Argemone mexicana (Mexican prickly poppy)
- Argyreia nervosa (baby Hawaiian wood rose, silver morning glory)
- Ariocarpus fissuratus (false peyote, living rock)
- Artemisia absinthium (absinthe, wormwood)
- Artemisia mexicana (Mexican wormwood)
- Artemisia spp.
- Arundo donax (giant reed)
- Atropa belladonna (belladonna, deadly nightshade)
- Banisteriopsis caapi (ayahuasca vine)
- Banisteriopsis spp.
- Boswellia sacra (frankincense tree)
- Brugmansia arborea (angel's trumpet tree)
- Brugmansia aurea (golden angel's trumpet)
- Brugmansia × candida (white angel's trumpet)
- Brugmansia x insignis (magnificent angel's trumpet)
- Brugmansia sanguinea (bloodred angel's trumpet)
- Brugmansia suaveolens (aromatic angel's trumpet)
- Brugmansia versicolor (Amazonian tree datura)
- Brugmansia spp. and hybrids (angel's trumpets and hybrids)
- Brunfelsia spp. (manaca, brunfelsia)
- Calea zacatechichi (Aztec dream grass, zacatechichi)
- Calliandra anomala (red powder puff)
- Calonyction muricatum (Ipomoea muricata; see Ipomoea spp.)
- Camellia sinensis (tea plant)
- Cannabis indica (Indian hemp)
- Cannabis ruderalis (weedy hemp)
- Cannabis sativa (fiber hemp)
- Cannabis x and hybrids (hemp hybrids)
- Carnegiea gigantea (saguaro, giant cactus)
- Catha edulis (khat)
- Cestrum nocturnum (night-blooming jessamine)
- Cestrum parqui (willow-leafed jessamine, palqui)
- Cinnamomum camphora (camphor tree)
- Cocos nucifera (coconut palm)
- Coffea arabica (coffee bush)
- Cola spp. (C. acuminata and C. nitida) (cola tree)
- Coleus blumei (coleus)
- Convolvulus tricolor (dwarf morning glory)
- Corynanthe spp. (pamprama)
- Coryphantha spp.
- Crocus sativus (saffron crocus)
- Cytisus canariensis (canary island broom)
- Cytisus spp. and relatives (broom species)
- Datura discolor (sacred datura)
- Datura ferox (Chinese datura) (see Datura innoxia)
- Datura innoxia (toloache, Mexican thorn apple)
- Datura metel (Indian thorn apple)
- Datura stramonium (common thorn apple)
- Datura wrightii (Wright's datura)
- Datura spp. (thorn apple species)
- Desfontainia spinosa (latuy)
- Diplopterys cabrerana (yahé vine)
- Duboisia hopwoodii (pituri bush)
- Duboisia spp. and hybrids (corkwood trees)
- Echinopsis spp. (sea urchin cactus)
- Ephedra gerardiana (somalata)
- Ephedra sinica (ma-huang)
- Ephedra spp.
- Erythrina americana (American coral tree)
- Erythrina berteroana (pito coral tree)
- Erythrina spp. (coral tree species)
- Erythroxylum coca (coca bush)
- Erythroxylum novogranatense (Colombian coca bush)
- Eschscholzia californica (golden poppy, California poppy)
- Fabiana imbricata (fabiana bush, pichi-pichi)
- Heimia salicifolia (sinicuiche)
- Humulus lupulus (hops)
- Hyoscyamus albus (yellow henbane)
- Hyoscyamus muticus (Egyptian henbane)
- Hyoscyamus niger (black henbane)
- Hyoscyamus spp. (henbane species)
- Ilex cassine (cassina tree)
- Ilex guayusa (guayusa)
- Ilex paraguariensis (maté bush)
- Ilex vomitoria (yaupon)
- Iochroma fuchsioides (yas)
- Ipomoea violacea (morning glory vine)
- Ipomoea spp.
- Juniperus recurva (drooping juniper)
- Justicia pectoralis (justicia)
- Lactuca virosa (wild lettuce)
- Latua pubiflora (latúe, tree of the magicians)
- Ledum palustre (wild rosemary)
- Leonurus sibiricus (Siberian motherwort)
- Lolium temulentum (bearded darnel)
- Lonchocarpus violaceus (balche' tree)
- Lophophora williamsii (peyote cactus)
- Mammillaria spp. (mammillaria cacti)
- Mandragora officinarum (mandrake)
- Mandragora spp.
- Mesembryanthemum spp. (ice plants)
- Methysticodendron amesianum (see Brugmansia × candida)
- Mimosa tenuiflora (jurema, tepescohuite)
- Mimosa spp.
- Mitragyna speciosa (kratom)
- Mucuna pruriens (cowhage)
- Myristica fragrans (nutmeg)
- Nicotiana rustica (Turkish tobacco, wild tobacco)
- Nicotiana tabacum (true tobacco)
- Nicotiana spp. (tobacco species)
- Nuphar lutea ((yellow water lily)
- Nymphaea ampla (white water lily)
- Nymphaea caerulea (blue lotus flower)
- Pachycereus pecten-aboriginum (pitayo)
- Papaver somniferum (opium poppy)
- Papaver spp. (poppy species)
- Passiflora spp. (passionflowers, passion fruits)
- Paullinia cupana (guaraná vine)
- Paullinia spp.
- Pausinystalia yohimba (yohimbé tree)
- Peganum harmala (Syrian rue, harmel)
- Pelecyphora aselliformis (false peyote, peyotillo)
- Petroselinum crispum (parsley)
- Phalaris arundinacea (reed canary grass)
- Phalaris spp. (canary grasses)
- Phragmites australis (reed)
- Phytolacca acinosa (pokeweed, shang lu)
- Piper auritum (gold pepper)
- Piper betle (betel pepper)
- Piper methysticum (kava)
- Piper spp. (pepper species)
- Psidium guajava (guajava tree, guava)
- Psychotria viridis (chacruna)
- Psychotria spp. (wild coffee)
- Rhynchosia pyramidalis (bird's eyes)
- Salvia divinorum (ska maría pastora)
- Sassafras albidum (sassafras tree)
- Sceletium tortuosum (kougoed, channa, kanna)
- Scopolia carniolica (scopolia)
- Solandra spp. (cup of gold)
- Solanum spp. (nightshade species)
- Sophora secundiflora (mescal bean)
- Strychnos nux-vomica (poison nut)
- Strychnos spp.
- Tabernaemontana spp.
- Tabernanthe iboga (iboga shrub)
- Tagetes spp. (marigolds)
- Tanaecium nocturnum (koribo)
- Theobroma cacao (cacao tree)
- Theobroma spp. (wild cacao)
- Trichocereus pachanoi (San Pedro cactus)
- Trichocereus peruvianus (Peruvian columnar cactus)
- Trichocereus spp. (columnar cacti)
- Turbina corymbosa (ololiuqui vine)
- Turnera diffusa (damiana)
- Vaccinium uliginosum (bog bilberry)
- Veratrum album (white hellebore)
- Virola spp. (epena, parika species)
- Vitis vinifera (grape)
- Withania somnifera (ashwagandha)

Note that in addition to the major plant monographs listed above, there are also many little-studied psychoactive plants covered, including minor monographs, reputed psychoactive plants, and psychoactive plants that have not yet been identified.

=== Major fungi monographs ===
- Amanita muscaria (fly agaric)
- Amanita pantherina (panther cap)
- Balansia cyperi (Cyprus grass fungus)
- Claviceps paspali (paspalum ergot)
- Claviceps purpurea (ergot)
- Claviceps spp. (ergot fungi)
- Conocybe spp. (cone caps)
- Copelandia spp. (ink caps)
- Galerina steglichii (Steglich's galerina)
- Gymnopilus spp. (gyms)
- Inocybe spp. -- (inocybe mushrooms)
- Panaeolus cyanescens (jambur)
- Panaeolus subbalteatus (dark-rimmed mottlegill)
- Panaeolus spp. (panaeolus mushrooms)
- Pluteus spp.
- "Polyporus mysticus" (polypore species)
- Psilocybe azurescens (indigo psilocybe)
- Psilocybe cubensis (magic mushroom, divine dung mushroom, golden cap)
- Psilocybe cyanescens (wavy caps)
- Psilocybe mexicana (Mexican magic mushroom, teonanacatl)
- Psilocybe semilanceata (liberty cap)
- Psilocybe spp. (psilocybin mushrooms)

Note that in addition to the major fungi monographs listed above, there are also various purported psychoactive fungi covered.

=== Psychoactive products ===
- Alcohol (distilled)
- Ayahuasca
- Ayahuasca analogs and pharmahuasca
- Balche'
- Beer
- Betel quids
- Chicha
- Cimora
- Enemas
- Energy drinks
- Han-Shi
- Haoma
- Herbal ecstasy
- Honey
- Incense
- Kinnikinnick
- Kykeon
- Madzoka medicine
- Mead
- Oriental joy pills
- Palm wine
- Pituri
- Sake
- Smoking blends
- Snuffs
- Soma
- Soporific sponge
- Theriac
- Wine
- Witches' ointments
- Zombie poison

=== Active constituents ===
- Atropine
- β-Carbolines
- β-Phenethylamines
- Bufotenine
- Caffeine
- Cocaine
- Codeine
- Coumarins
- Cytisine
- Diazepam
- Diterpenes
- Ephedrine
- Ergot alkaloids
- Essential oils
- 5-MeO-DMT
- Harmaline and harmine
- Ibogaine
- Ibotenic acid
- Indole alkaloids
- Mescaline
- Morphine
- Muscimol
- Nicotine
- N,N-DMT
- Opium alkaloids
- Papaverine
- Psilocybin and psilocin
- Salvinorin A
- Scopolamine
- Scopoletin
- Strychnine
- THC
- Tropane alkaloids
- Withanolides
- Yohimbine

== See also ==
- Psychoactive plant
- List of psychedelic literature
- List of psychoactive plants
- List of psychoactive plants, fungi, and animals
- List of substances used in rituals
- The Botany and Chemistry of Hallucinogens (1973/1980)
- Plants of the Gods (1979/2001)
- Pharmacotheon (1993/1996)
