= Pharmacotheon =

1993 book about entheogens

- Author: Jonathan Ott
- Working title: Pharmacotheon: Entheogenic Drugs, Their Plant Sources and History
- Language: English
- Subject: Entheogens (hallucinogenic plants and fungi and their active constituents)
- Genre: Non-fiction
- Publisher: Natural Products Company
- Publication date: 1st edition: 1993; 2nd edition: 1996
- Publication place: Kennewick, Washington
- Pages: 639–640 (both editions)
- ISBN: 978-0961423438 (1st ed.)
- OCLC: 29985390
- Website: 2nd/1996 ed. - Internet Archive

Pharmacotheon: Entheogenic Drugs, Their Plant Sources and History is a 1993 book about entheogens, or more specifically hallucinogenic plants and fungi and their active constituents, that was written by the American ethnobotanist Jonathan Ott. The first edition of the book was published in 1993, and then a second, densified edition was published in 1996.

The book has chapters on mescaline and other phenethylamines (peyote, San Pedro), ergolines (morning glory, kykeon), dimethyltryptamine (DMT) (cohoba, epená), β-carbolines (ayahuasca), psilocybin and psilocin (psilocybin-containing mushrooms), and ibotenic acid and muscimol (Amanita muscaria). In addition, there are several appendices that cover various additional psychoactive products, including asarone (Acorus calamus), tropane deliriants (nightshades), ibogaine (Tabernanthe iboga), nicotine (tobacco), kavalactones (kava), salvinorin A (Salvia divinorum), tetrahydrocannabinol (THC) (cannabis), and thujone (Artemisia), along with other topics. The book details more than 1,000 psychoactive plant species in total. It also includes various original bioassays by Ott and his associates.

Pharmacotheon followed earlier related works like Richard Evans Schultes and Albert Hofmann's The Botany and Chemistry of Hallucinogens (1973/1980) and Plants of the Gods (1979). According to Ott, the former and more academic book had the best existing bibliography on hallucinogenic plants and fungi. In Pharmacotheon, Ott updated and expanded this bibliography to three times its original size, for a total of 124 pages and 2,440 cited sources. Additionally, he focused in detail on the complex history of entheogens in the book. Pharmacotheon was dedicated to the memory of R. Gordon Wasson and its foreword was written by Albert Hofmann.

Book reviews of Pharmacotheon have been published. The book was described as the culmination of Ott's knowledge and work to date at the time of its publication and has been described as his magnum opus and best-known work. Albert Hofmann and Alexander Shulgin both praised the book, with Shulgin referring to it as a "thing of beauty".

== See also ==
- Psychoactive plant
- List of psychedelic literature
- List of psychoactive plants
- List of psychoactive plants, fungi, and animals
- List of substances used in rituals
- The Encyclopedia of Psychoactive Plants (1998/2005)
