= The Botany and Chemistry of Hallucinogens =

- Cover of the 1st edition (1973).
- Author: Richard Evans Schultes and Albert Hofmann
- Language: English
- Series: American Lecture Series
- Release number: 843 (1973/1st ed.); 1025 (1980/2nd ed.)
- Subject: Hallucinogenic plants and fungi
- Genre: Non-fiction
- Publisher: Charles C Thomas
- Publication date: 1973 (1st ed.), 1980 (2nd ed.)
- Publication place: Springfield, Illinois
- Pages: 267 (1973/1st ed.); 464 (1980/2nd ed.)
- ISBN: 978-0-398-02401-7 (1973/1st ed.)
- OCLC: 628131
- Dewey Decimal: 615/.7883
- LC Class: 72-187675
- Website: 1st ed. (1973); 2nd ed. (1980)

The Botany and Chemistry of Hallucinogens is a 1973 scientific and scholarly book about hallucinogenic plants and fungi written by the American ethnobotanist Richard Evans Schultes and the German chemist Albert Hofmann. The first edition was published in 1973 and is 267 pages, while a revised and enlarged second edition was published in 1980 and is 464 pages.

It is said to review all known species of hallucinogenic plants and fungi used by various cultures, including their botany, chemistry, history, cultural contexts, and additional topics. This included in the second edition chapters on the 14 major hallucinogens, including Amanita muscaria, various deliriant plants (henbane, nightshade, and mandrake), Cannabis species, Claviceps species (ergot), the hallucinogen of the Eleusinian mysteries, Datura species, Tabernanthe iboga (iboga), Anadenanthera species, Banisteriopsis species (ayahuasca), Brugmansia species, Lophophora species (peyote), psilocybin mushrooms (various species), Trichocereus species (San Pedro), morning glory, and Virola species. There is abundant use of figures and an extensive bibliography. The preface of the book was written by Heinrich Klüver.

The book has been reviewed by various authors. Upon its publications, the book has been described by reviewers as the most authoritative work and the "standard scientific source" on its subjects and was said to be the "most complete and reliable text on plant hallucinogens available". It is more academic and less popular and illustrated than Schultes and Hofmann's related layperson-intended book Plants of the Gods: Origins of Hallucinogenic Use (1979). Both books were subsequently followed by Christian Rätsch's more extensive work Enzyklopädie der Psychoaktiven Pflanzen: Botanik, Ethnopharmakologie und Anwendung (The Encyclopedia of Psychoactive Plants: Ethnopharmacology and Its Applications) (1998; English translation 2005).

== See also ==
- Psychoactive plant
- List of psychedelic literature
- List of psychoactive plants
- List of psychoactive plants, fungi, and animals
- List of substances used in rituals
- Plants of the Gods (1979/2001)
- The Encyclopedia of Psychoactive Plants (2005)
- Pharmacotheon (1993/1996)
