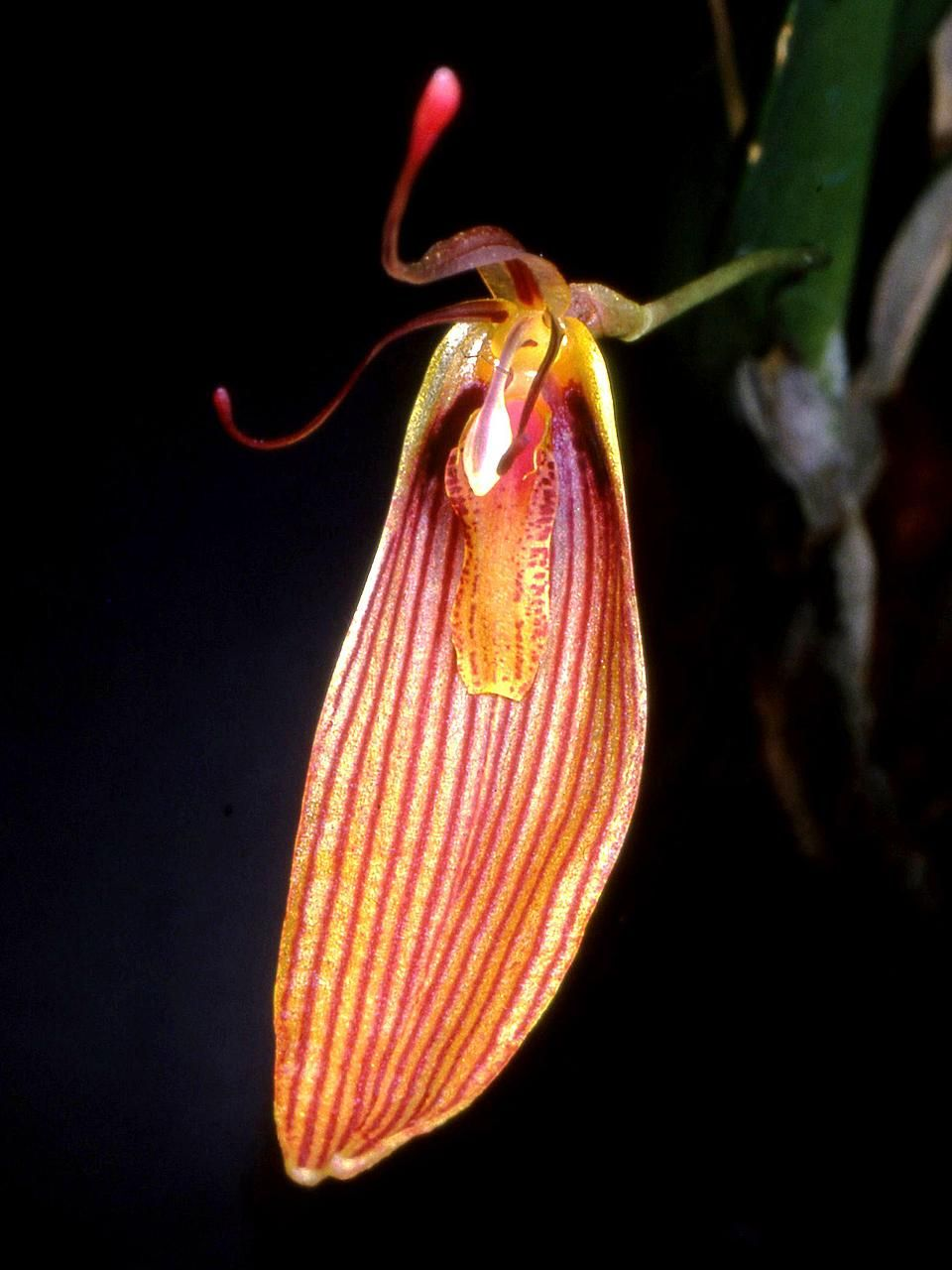

Scientific classification
- Kingdom: Plantae
- Clade: Tracheophytes
- Clade: Angiosperms
- Clade: Monocots
- Order: Asparagales
- Family: Orchidaceae
- Subfamily: Epidendroideae
- Genus: Restrepia
- Species: R. antennifera

Binomial name
- Restrepia antennifera Kunth

Synonyms
- Pleurothallis ospinae R.E.Schult.; Restrepia hemsleyana Schltr.; Restrepia antennifera ssp. hemsleyana (Schltr.) H.Mohr; Restrepia antennifera ssp. klabochorum H.Mohr

= Restrepia antennifera =

Antennae-carrying restrepia

Species of orchid

Restrepia antennifera, the antennae-carrying restrepia, is an epiphytic, miniature species of orchid found at higher altitudes in cool, moist montane forests in Venezuela, Colombia, Ecuador and Peru.

These tiny orchids lack pseudobulbs. The erect, thick, leathery leaf is elliptic-ovate in shape. The aerial roots seem like fine hairs.

The attractive flowers are 5–6 cm long. They develop one at a time at the base of the leaf. They are borne on a slender peduncle, originating from the base of the back of the leaf. The long dorsal sepal is erect, triangular at the base and ends in a somewhat thicker club-shaped tip (= clavate). They have fused lateral sepals (synsepals) which may be quite colorful: yellow, orange or tan with contrasting maroon lengthwise stripes. The long, slender, lateral petals equally end in a thickened club-shaped tip. The long lip is ovoid and widest at its apex. It shows a reddish lengthwise stripe. In rare cases, the synsepals may split, resulting in two separate sepals. The column has four pollinia.

Restrepia antennifera is well-known to orchid growers, although many other Restrepias are misidentified as "antennifera". The flower blooms for 1 to 2 weeks. They flower again and again in sequential order from the same growth.
