= LSD, My Problem Child =

Book by Albert Hofmann

- Author: Albert Hofmann
- Original title: LSD – Mein Sorgenkind
- Translator: Jonathan Ott
- Language: English
- Subject: LSD
- Genre: Non-fiction
- Publisher: McGraw-Hill
- Publication date: 1980
- Publication place: New York, New York
- Pages: 209
- ISBN: 9780070293250
- OCLC: 6251390
- Website: Internet Archive; PDF
- Originally German as LSD – Mein Sorgenkind (1979), translated into English as LSD: My Problem Child (1980).

LSD, My Problem Child, also known as LSD – Mein Sorgenkind, is a 1979 German-language book and 1980 English-language book about the psychedelic drug lysergic acid diethylamide (LSD) by Albert Hofmann. The book was first published in German by Hofmann in 1979 and was translated into and published in English by Jonathan Ott in 1980.

Hofmann was the chemist working at Sandoz who discovered LSD and its hallucinogenic effects in 1938 and 1943, respectively. He describes his first psychedelic experiences with LSD in the book, including his high-dose experience on Bicycle Day or April 19th, 1943 and his low-dose experience a few days earlier on April 16th, 1943. Hofmann expressed hope in the book that LSD could someday be used under more suitable conditions and change from being his "problem child" to his "wonder child".

LSD: My Problem Child has been reviewed by various authors.

== See also ==
- Bibliography of Albert Hofmann
- List of psychedelic literature
- List of books and publications related to the hippie subculture
