= Claudia Müller-Ebeling =

German anthropologist and art historian

Claudia Müller-Ebeling (born 1956), is a German anthropologist and art historian. She has coauthored with her husband Christian Rätsch (and in association with others) a number of works of shamanic pharmacopoeia, ethnopharmaceuticals and ethnohallucinogens. Müller-Ebeling resides in Hamburg, Germany.

== Works ==
- Müller-Ebeling, Claudia and Christian Rätsch and Surendra Bahadur Shahi (2002). Shamanism and Tantra in the Himalayas. Transl. by Annabel Lee. Rochester, Vt.: Inner Traditions International;
- Witchcraft Medicine: Healing Arts, Shamanic Practices, and Forbidden Plants (2003) ISBN 978-0-89281-971-3;
- Pagan Christmas: The Plants, Spirits, and Rituals at the Origin of Yuletide.
- Claudia Müller-Ebeling, Christian Rätsch and Arno Adaalars (2016). Ayahuasca:Rituals, Potions and Visionary Art from the Amazon Published by Divine Arts. ISBN 9781611250510
