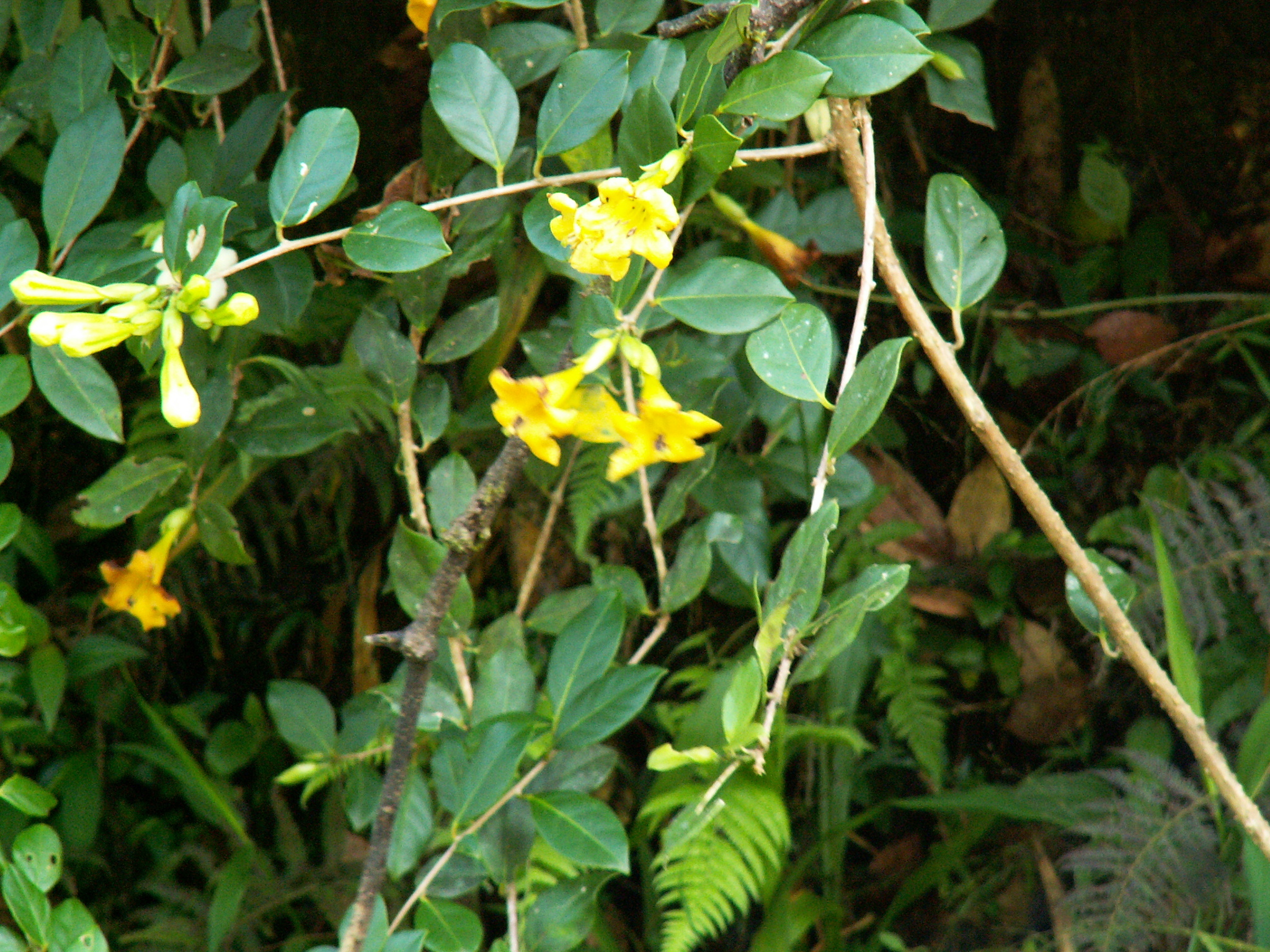
- Schultesianthus megalandrus

Scientific classification
- Kingdom: Plantae
- Clade: Embryophytes
- Clade: Tracheophytes
- Clade: Spermatophytes
- Clade: Angiosperms
- Clade: Eudicots
- Clade: Asterids
- Order: Solanales
- Family: Solanaceae
- Genus: Schultesianthus; Hunz.

= Schultesianthus =

Genus of flowering plants

Schultesianthus is a genus of flowering plants belonging to the family Solanaceae.

Its native range is from southern Mexico down to Venezuela and Peru. It is also found in Colombia, Costa Rica, Ecuador, Guatemala, Honduras and Panamá.

The genus Schultesianthus was erected in 1977 by the Argentine botanist Armando Theodoro Hunziker and is named in honour of the American biologist Richard Evans Schultes.

== Species ==
The following species are recognised in the genus Schultesianthus:

- Schultesianthus coriaceus (Kuntze) Hunz.
- Schultesianthus crosbyanus (D'Arcy) S.Knapp
- Schultesianthus dudleyi Bernardello & Hunz.
- Schultesianthus leucanthus (Donn.Sm.) Hunz.
- Schultesianthus megalandrus (Dunal) Hunz.
- Schultesianthus odorifer (Cuatrec.) Hunz.
- Schultesianthus uniflorus (Lundell) S.Knapp
- Schultesianthus venosus (Standl. & C.V.Morton) S.Knapp
