= Resia (plant) =

Scientific classification
- Kingdom: Plantae
- Clade: Tracheophytes
- Clade: Angiosperms
- Clade: Eudicots
- Clade: Asterids
- Order: Lamiales
- Family: Gesneriaceae
- Genus: Resia; H.E.Moore

Species
- See text

Genus of flowering plants

Resia is a genus of plants in the family Gesneriaceae. They are also in the Beslerieae tribe.

They are native to Colombia and Venezuela in South America. They were also found in Ecuador in 2015.

== Description ==
It is close in form to Napeanthus Gardner (another South American Gesneriaceae genus), but the flowers, leaves, stamens and seed capsules are different.

It is a perennial sub-shrub with fibrous roots and short to elongate, sometimes branched woody stems. The leaves are subsessile (having a very short footstalk) or shortly petiolate, which is congested in a terminal crown. The flowers are cymose (having a cyme), axillary (at leaf joints), pedunculate (stalked) and ebracteate (lacking bracts). They are zygomorphic (bilaterally symmetrical) with a calyx of 5 distinct sepals which are inconspicuously nerved (or veined) in flower. They are thickened and conspicuously 5-7 nerved when in fruit. The corolla is tubular with bilbabiate (having two lips) limb of 5 spreading lobes. The upper 2 lobes are acute and shorter than the 3 rounded lower lobes. It has 4 stamens, with the filaments adnate (grown from or closely fused) to the corolla tube to the middle, then free, glabrous (lacking surface ornamentation) and geniculate (bent at a sharp angle), with anthers coherent in a square by their tips, cells of each anther confluent and dehiscing longitudinally. It has 1 staminode (a sterile stamen). The disk (floret) is prominent and annular (ring-like). The ovary is superior (borne above the level of attachment of the other floral parts) and laterally compressed. It is densely pilose (covered with soft, weak, thin and clearly separated hairs), ovoid, with branched placentas ovuliferous on both surfaces. The style is elongated and the stigma is briefly bilobed stomatomorphic (mouth-shaped). The fruit (or seed capsule) is a laterally compressed loculicidal (side splitting) capsule which is shorter than the calyx with 2 apiculate (ending in a short triangular point) pilose valves and minute brown granular-striate seeds.

== Known species ==
It contains the following species, according to Plants of the World Online;

- Resia bracteata J.L.Clark & L.E.Skog
- Resia ichthyoides Leeuwenb.
- Resia nimbicola H.E.Moore
- Resia umbratica Fern.Alonso

The type species is Resia nimbicola.

== Taxonomy ==
The genus name of Resia is in honour of Richard Evans Schultes (1915–2001), an American biologist. He may be considered the father of modern ethnobotany. It was first described and published in Botanical Museum Leaflets, Harvard University (Bot. Mus. Leafl.) Vol.20 on page 87 in 1962.

The genus is recognized by the United States Department of Agriculture and the Agricultural Research Service, but they do not list any known species.
