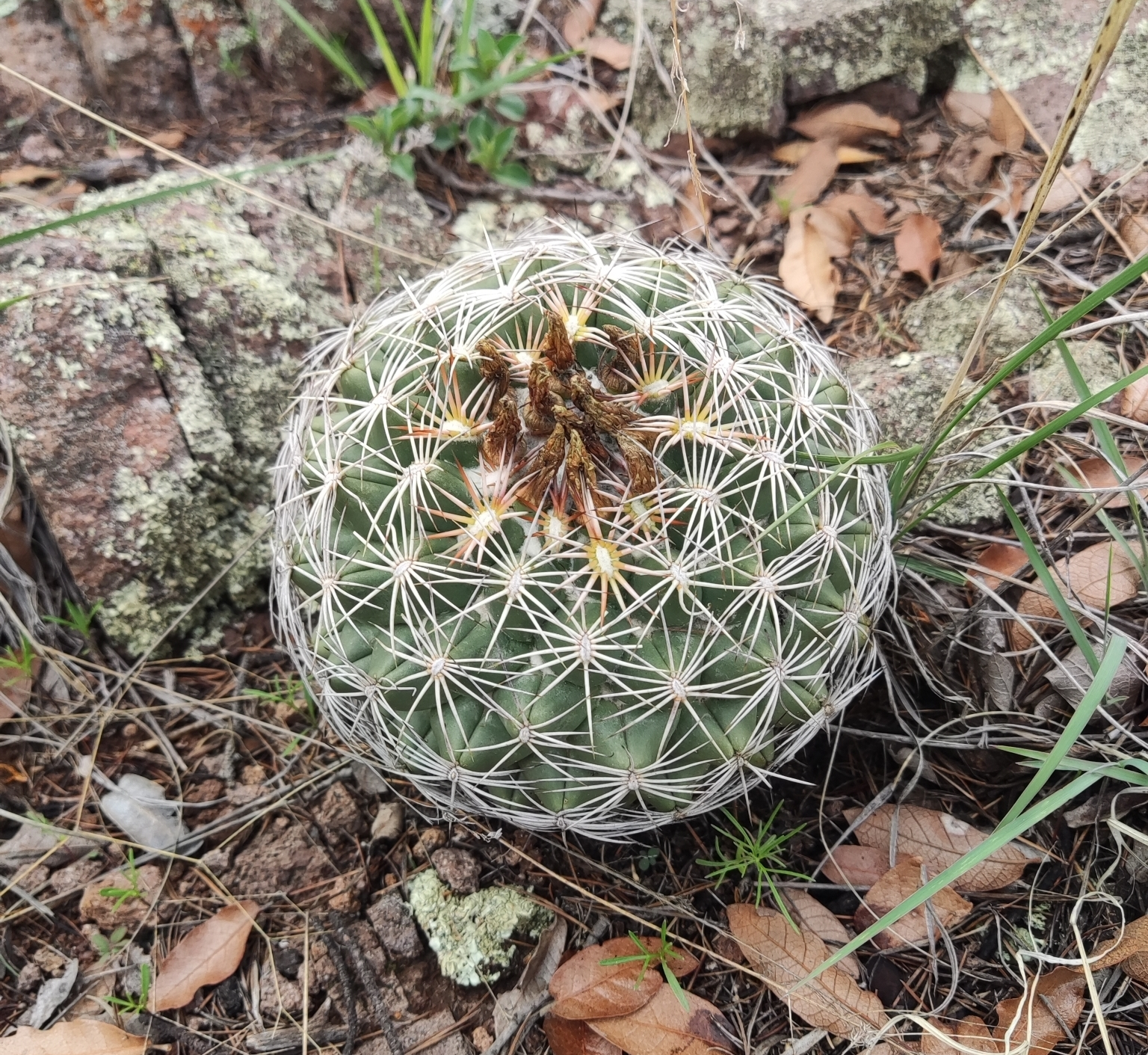

Conservation status
- Least Concern (IUCN 3.1)

Scientific classification
- Kingdom: Plantae
- Clade: Tracheophytes
- Clade: Angiosperms
- Clade: Eudicots
- Order: Caryophyllales
- Family: Cactaceae
- Subfamily: Cactoideae
- Genus: Coryphantha
- Species: C. compacta

Binomial name
- Coryphantha compacta (Engelm.) Orcutt
- Coryphantha compacta distribution

Synonyms
- Cactus compactus (Engelm.) Kuntze (1891); Mammillaria compacta Engelm. (1848); Coryphantha palmeri Britton & Rose (1923); Coryphantha recurvata subsp. canatlanensis Dicht & A.Lüthy (2003)

= Coryphantha compacta =

Cactus species found only in Mexico

Coryphantha cornifera is a species of cactus that is endemic to Mexico.

== Description ==
Coryphantha compacta typically, but not always, grows alone. Its stems are globose, but slightly flattened at the top. Mature stems average slightly over 3 inches (8cm) in diameter.

As seen at the right, the outer part of the cactus's body is separated into low tubercles which clump together looking like the bottoms of green chili peppers. A cluster of 11-16 slender, white-to-yellow spines arises atop each tubercle, emerging from special areas known as areoles. Most of the spines radiate outwardly, keeping close to the cactus's surface, with their tips somewhat overlapping the tips of neighboring clusters. Arising from the center of each spine cluster there may or may not be a central spine, which is hooked at its tip, like a cat's claw. Usually flowers -- which are only about 2m long (~¾ inch) -- are pale yellow. The fruits are egg-shaped and orangish brown.

== Distribution ==
The iNaturalist website documents research-grade observations in the northwestern Mexican states of Chihuahua, Sonora, Sinaloa and Durango.

== Habitat ==
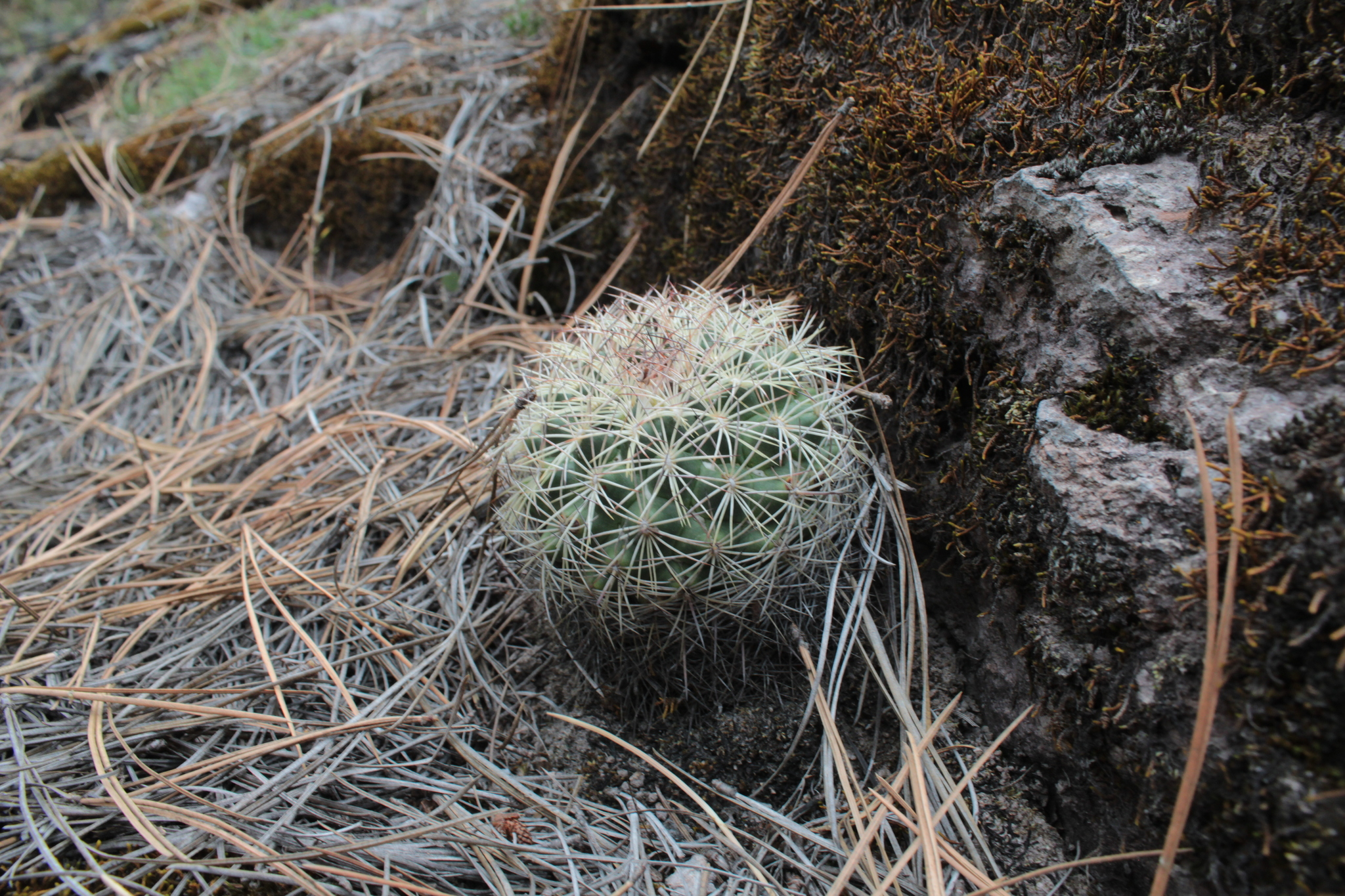
Coryphatha compacta in habitat

Coryphatha compacta mainly inhabits desert and dry scrub at elevations of 1400-2400m (4600-7900ft). This environment includes sandy open areas such as the tops of low hills in soils of volcanic origin. In these spots it's possible to encounter other cactus and succulent species such as Cochemiea wrightii, Mammillaria heyderi, Erythrina americana y Nolina texana.

== Taxonomy ==
The first description of this species was under the name of Mammillaria compacta, published in 1848 by the German botanist George Engelmann, in the book Memoir of a Tour to Northern Mexico: connected with Col. Doniphan's Expedition. In 1922 the US botanist Charles Russell Orcutt shifted the species to the genus Coryphantha, as Coryphantha compacta.

== Conservation status ==
In the IUCN Red List the species is classified as a least concern species (LC). However, agricultural and ranching practices can be regarded as a future threat in some places.

== Cultural importance ==
Mexico's indigenous Tarahumara or Rarámuri people consider Coryphantha compacta as a kind of peyote; shamans employ it to convey fear and respect. The cactus is also used medicinally to ease rheumatism and urinary problems.
