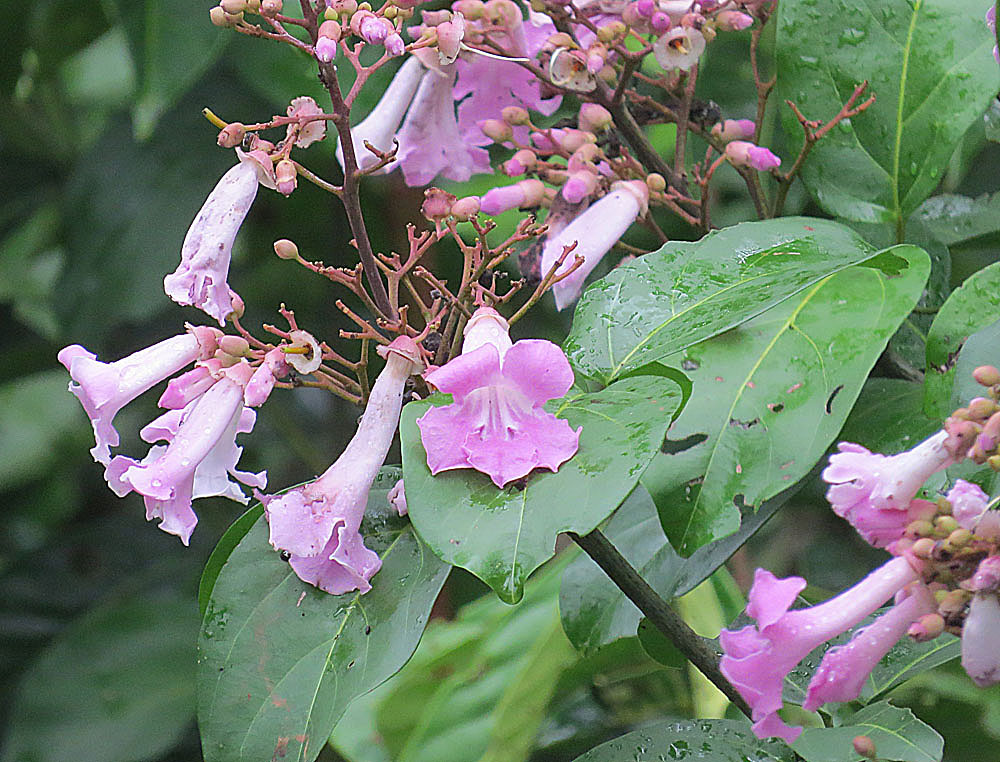
- Tanaecium pyramidatum

Scientific classification
- Kingdom: Plantae
- Clade: Tracheophytes
- Clade: Angiosperms
- Clade: Eudicots
- Clade: Asterids
- Order: Lamiales
- Family: Bignoniaceae
- Tribe: Bignonieae
- Genus: Tanaecium; Sw.

Species
- See text

Synonyms
- Ceratophytum Pittier; Hilariophyton Pichon; Paragonia Bureau; Periarrabidaea A.Samp.; Pseudocatalpa A.H.Gentry; Sanhilaria Baill.; Spathicalyx J.C.Gomes

= Tanaecium =

Genus of flowering plants

Tanaecium is a genus of flowering plants in the family Bignoniaceae, native to south and Central America.

== Species ==
- Tanaecium affinis (A.H Gentry) L.G. Lohmann
- Tanaceium apiculatum A.H Gentry
- Tanaecium bilabiatum (Sprague) L.G. Lohmann
- Tanaceium caudiculatum (Standl) L.G. Lohmann
- Tanaceium crucigerum Seem.
- Tanaceium cyrtanthum (Mart. ex DC.) Bureau & K.Schum.
- Tanaecium duckei A. Samp.
- Tanaecium exitiosum Dugand
- Tanaecium jaroba Sw.
- Tanaecium neobrasiliensis Baill. L.G. Lohmann
- Tanaecium nocturnum
- Tanaecium pyramidatum (Rich.) L.G. Lohmann
- Tanaecium revillae (A.H. Gentry) L.G. Lohmann
- Tanaecium selloi (Spreng.) L.G. Lohmann
- Tanaecium tetragonolobum (Jacq.) L.G. Lohmann
- Tanaecium truncatum (A. Samp.) L.G. Lohmann
- Tanaecium xanthophyllum (DC.) L.G. Lohmann
