= Psychedelic Press =

Publishing and media organisation

Psychedelic Press is an independent publisher and media organisation launched in 2008 as a website devoted to reviews of literature focused on entheogens and psychedelic substances. The website has since expanded to an online magazine format, consisting of interviews, news and articles encompassing psychedelic culture, literature, history and science of psychoactive plants and compounds.

In 2012 the Psychedelic Press print journal was established and Psychedelic Press UK has grown to a publishing house with a bi-monthly journal and range of books consisting of works of fiction, non-fiction and poetry, covering psychoactive substances and altered states of consciousness from the perspective of wide range of disciplines. The journal has published contributions from authors such as DMT researcher Rick Strassman, Stanislav Grof, the co-founder of transpersonal psychology, LSD historian Andy Roberts and Mike Jay. The publisher also works with independent artists including some of Britain’s leading visionary artists like Stuart Griggs to produce the cover art for publications.

== Books ==
- Science Revealed (2014) by Reverend Nemu
- Erin (2015) by Robert Dickins
- To Fathom Hell or Soar Angelic (2015) by Ben Sessa
- Noumenautics (2015) by Peter Sjöstedt-H
- Acid Drops (2016) by Andy Roberts
- Modes of Sentience (2021) by Peter Sjöstedt-Hughes
