= Jonathan Ott =

American ethnobotanist and writer (1949–2025)

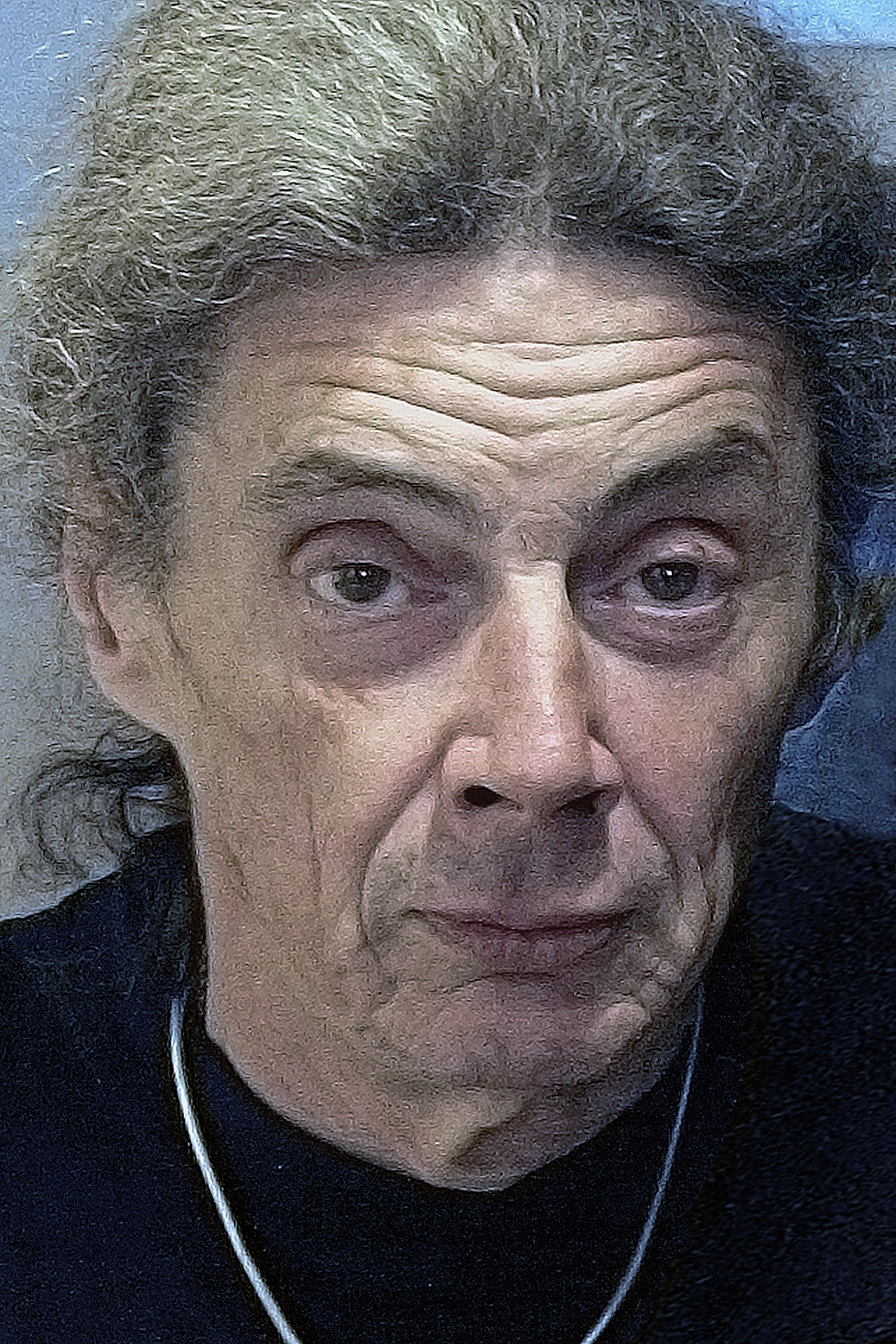
- Jonathan Ott in 2008
- Born: January 6, 1949; Hartford, Connecticut, U.S.
- Died: July 3, 2025 (aged 76)
- Occupations: Author and researcher
- Years active: 1975–2025
- Known for: psychedelic drug research
- Notable work: Pharmacotheon (1993/1996), many others
- Scientific career
- Author abbrev. (botany): J.Ott

Jonathan Ott (January 6, 1949 – July 3, 2025) was an American ethnobotanist, writer, translator, publisher, natural products chemist and botanical researcher of psychoactive substances and their cultural and historical use, helped coin the term entheogen, and confirmed the psychoactivity of bufotenin.

== Writings ==
Ott wrote eight books, co-written five, and contributed to four others, and published many articles in the field of entheogens, pharmacology and ethnobotany. His comprehensive 1993 book, Pharmacotheon: Entheogenic Drugs, Their Plant Sources and History has been described as one of the important works on the subject of entheogenic drugs. It describes over 1,000 plants and chemical compounds. He collaborated with other researchers like Christian Rätsch, Jochen Gartz, Richard E. Schultes and the late ethnomycologist R. Gordon Wasson. He translated Albert Hofmann's 1979 book LSD: My Problem Child (LSD: Mein Sorgenkind), and On Aztec Botanical Names by Blas Pablo Reko, into English. His articles have appeared in many publications and journals, including The Entheogen Review, The Entheogen Law Reporter, the Journal of Cognitive Liberties, the Journal of Psychoactive Drugs (aka the Journal of Psychedelic Drugs), the MAPS Bulletin, Head, High Times, Curare, Eleusis, Integration, Lloydia, The Sacred Mushroom Seeker, and several Harvard Botanical Museum pamphlets. He was a co-editor of Eleusis: Journal of Psychoactive Plants & Compounds, along with Giorgio Samorini.

== Botanical research ==
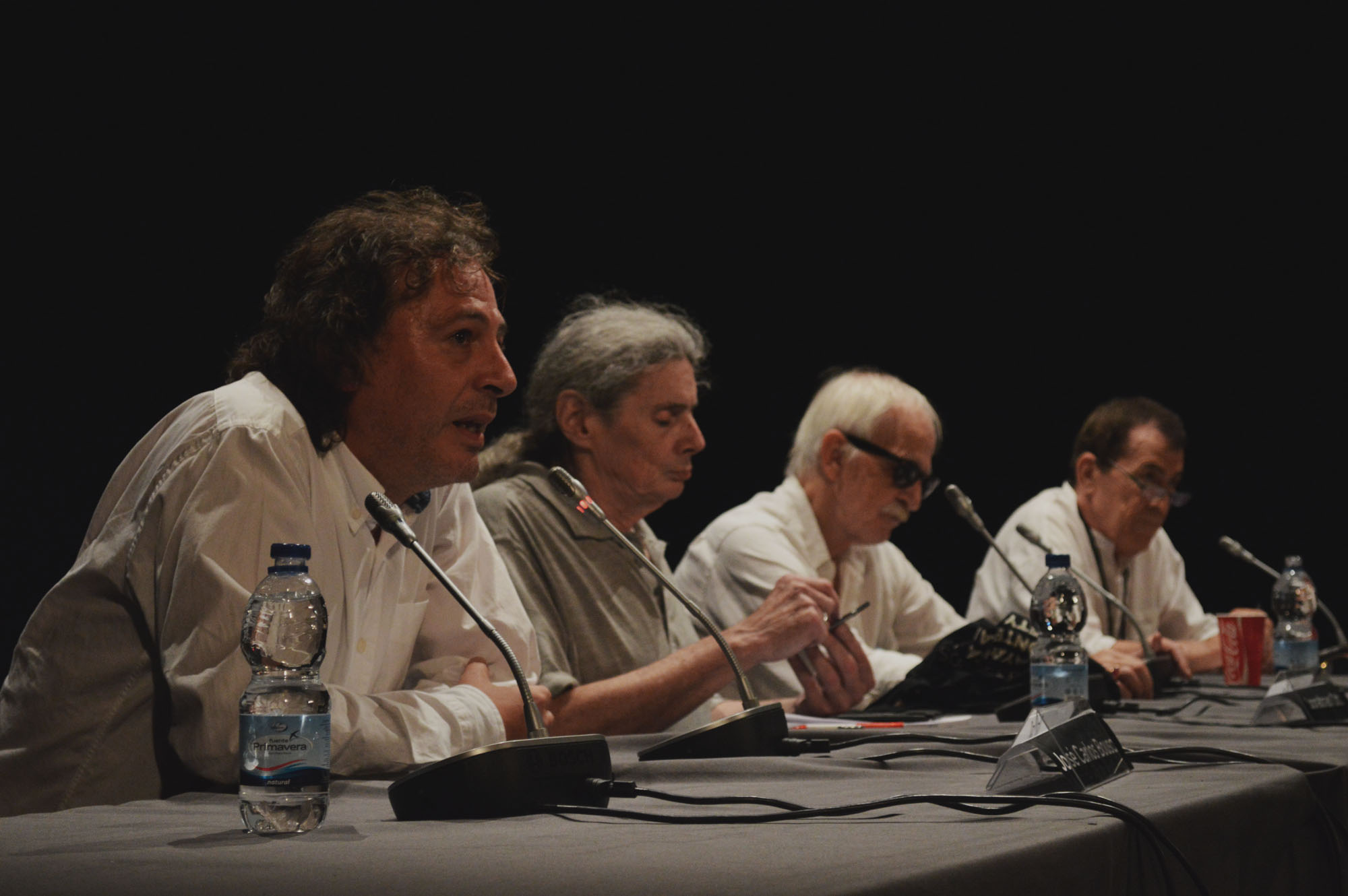
Ott (second from left) in 2014 at the World Ayahuasca Conference in Ibiza. From left to right: José Carlos Bouso, Ott, Antonio Escohotado and Fernando Sánchez Dragó

Ott had experience of field collecting in Mexico, where he lived and managed a small natural-products laboratory and botanical garden of medicinal herbs. A number of his ethno-botanical products have been studied to determine their possible benefits to individuals suffering various mental illnesses. In his book Ayahuasca Analogues, he identifies numerous plants around the globe containing the harmala alkaloids of Banisteriopsis caapi, which are MAOIs, and plants containing dimethyltryptamine (DMT), which together are the chemical base of the South American Ayahuasca ritual.

== Arson ==
In March 2010, Ott's home in Mexico was destroyed by arson. While most of his books survived the fire, Ott's laboratory and personal effects were destroyed in the blaze. Books given to Ott by Albert Hofmann were reportedly used as fuel.

== Death ==
Ott died on July 5, 2025, at the age of 76 due to complications with sepsis.

== Works ==
=== Books ===
- A Conscientious Guide to Hallucinogens: A Comprehensive Guide to Hallucinogens, Natural and Synthetic, Found in North American and the World with Joe E Axton and Jeremy Bigwood (1975) Do It Now Foundation, Institute for Chemical Survival
- Hallucinogenic Plants of North America (1976), ISBN 0-914728-16-4
- Teonanacatl: Hallucinogenic Mushrooms of North America (Co-edited by Jeremy Bigwood) (1978), ISBN 0-914842-32-3
- LSD: My Problem Child (1980) McGraw-Hill Book Company ISBN 0-07-029325-2 (translation only)
- The Cacahuatl Eater: Ruminations of an Unabashed Chocolate Addict (Natural Products Company) (1985) ISBN 0-9614234-1-2
- Persephone's Quest: Entheogens and the Origins of Religion with R. Gordon Wasson, Stella Kramrisch, and Carl A. P. Ruck (1986) ISBN 0-300-05266-9
- The Sacred Mushroom Seeker: Essays for R. Gordon Wasson by Robert Gordon Wasson, Thomas J. Riedlinger (1990) contributor
- Pharmacotheon: Entheogenic Drugs, Their Plant Sources and History (1993), ISBN 0-9614234-2-0
- Ayahuasca Analogues: Pangaean Entheogens (1995), ISBN 0-9614234-4-7
- Plant Intoxicants: a Classic Text on the Use of Mind-Altering Plants by Ernst Bibra and Jonathan Ott (1995) Nature
- Age of Entheogens & the Angels' Dictionary (1995), ISBN 0-9614234-6-3
- Pharmacophilia: The Natural Paradise (1997), ISBN 1-888755-00-8
- Shamanic Snuffs or Entheogenic Errhines (2001), ISBN 1-888755-02-4
- Ometochtzin: Las Muertes de Dos Conejos (2001)
- Drugs of the Dreaming: Oneirogens: Salvia Divinorum and Other Dream-Enhancing Plants with Gianluca Toro and Benjamin Thomas (2007) Body, Mind & Spirit
- The Road to Eleusis (2008) By R. Gordon Wasson, Albert Hofmann, Carl A. P. Ruck, Huston Smith (contributor)

=== Articles ===
- Mr. Jonathan Ott's Rejoinder to Dr. Alexander H. Smith by Jonathan Ott and Alexander Hanchett Smith (1978) Botanical Museum of Harvard University
- Ethnopharmacognosy and Human Pharmacology of Salvia divinorum and Salvinorin A (1995)
- Pharmahuasca: On Phenethylamines and Potentiation (1996)
- Pharmahuasca, Anahuasca and Vinho da Jurema: Human Pharmacology of Oral DMT Plus Harmine (1997)
- The Delphic Bee: Bees and Toxic Honeys as Pointers to Psychoactive and Other Medicinal Plants - Economic Botany (1998)
- Applied Psychonautics: Ayahuasca to Pharmahuasca to Anahuasca (2001)
- Pharmanopo-Psychonautics: Human Intranasal, Sublingual, Intrarectal, Pulmonary and Oral Pharmacology of Bufotenine (2001)
- Jonathan Ott's victim of arson, signed copies of Albert Hofmann books used to start fire (2010)

== See also ==
- Richard E. Schultes
- Ethnobotany
- Psychedelic plants
- Amanita Muscaria in pop-culture

== Sources ==
- The Road to Eleusis (2008) By R. Gordon Wasson, Albert Hofmann, Carl A. P. Ruck, Huston Smith
- Psychedelics Encyclopedia by Peter G. Stafford, Jeremy Bigwood (1992) Page 379
- Researching Paganisms by Jenny Blain, Douglas Ezzy, Graham Harvey (2004) Page 87
- Brain Boosters: Food & Drugs That Make You Smarter by Beverly A. Potter, Sebastian Orfali, Potter & Orfali, Gini Graham Scott (1993) Health & Fitness - Page 191
- Yajé: The New Purgatory: Encounters with Ayahuasca by Jimmy Weiskopf (2005) Page 145
- Toads and Toadstools: the Natural History, Folklore, and Cultural Oddities of This Strange Association by Adrian Morgan (1995) Page 116
