= Bicycle Day (psychedelic holiday) =

Informal annual observance on April 19

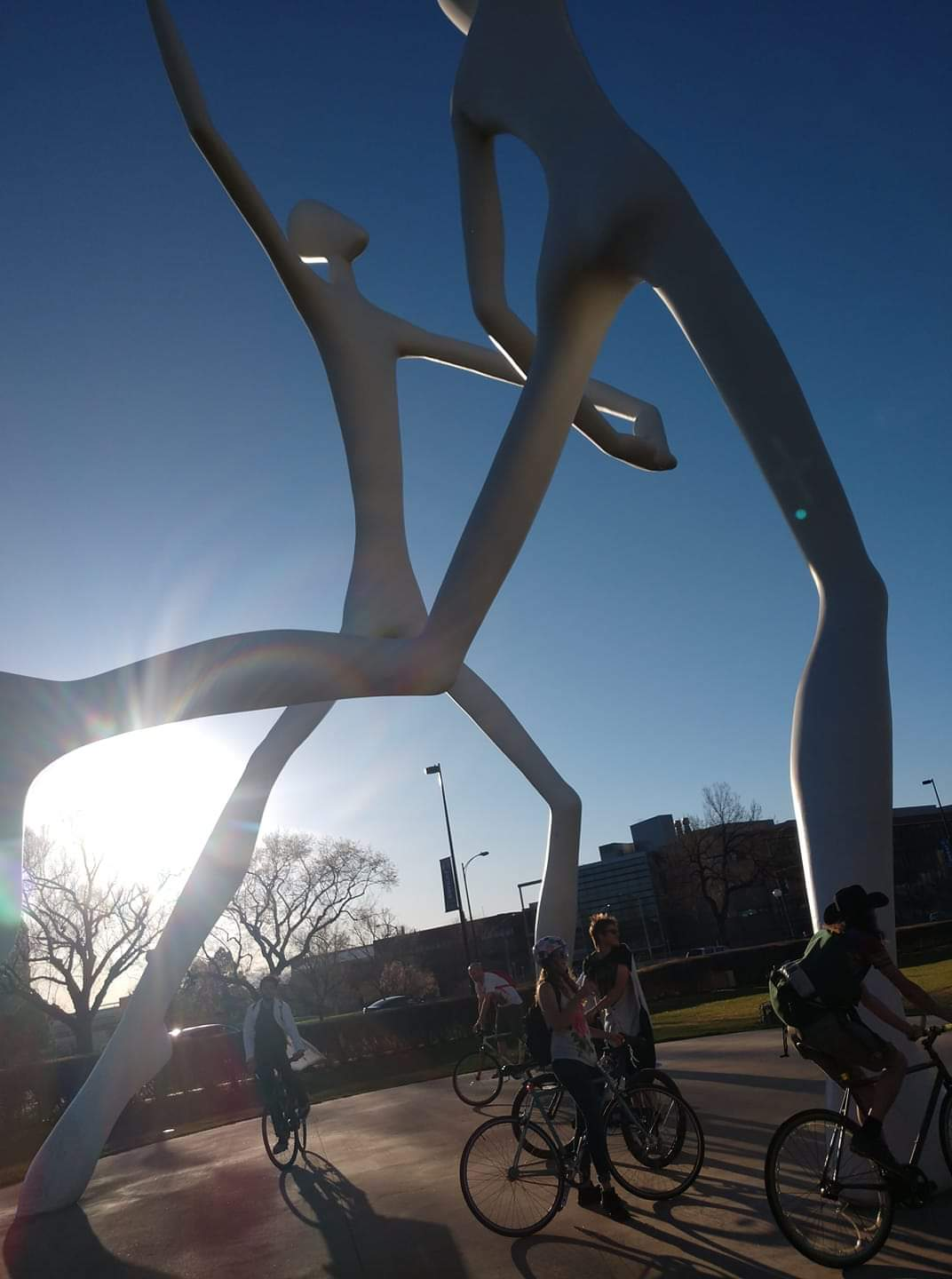
- Denver Bicycle Day Parade in 2019. A psychedelic enthusiast wears a lab coat honoring Dr. Hofmann.
- Type: Secular & Spiritual
- Celebrations: Consumption of lysergic acid diethylamide (LSD) or other psychedelics, riding a bike, organizing a bicycle parade, microdosing, psychedelic-themed festivities
- Observances: Honors the anniversary of the first ever intentional acid trip, undergone by Swiss chemist Albert Hofmann on April 19, 1943, in Basel, Switzerland, and the impact of the psychedelic revolution for science, medicine and human evolution
- Date: April 19
- Next time: 19 April 2027
- Frequency: Annual

Bicycle Day is an unofficial celebration on April 19 of the psychedelic revolution and the first psychedelic trip on LSD by Albert Hofmann in 1943, in tandem with his bicycle ride home from Sandoz Labs. It is commonly celebrated by ingesting psychedelics and riding a bike, sometimes in a parade, and often with psychedelic-themed festivities. The holiday was first named and declared in 1985 by Thomas Roberts, a psychology professor at Northern Illinois University, but has likely been celebrated by psychedelic enthusiasts since the beginning of the psychedelic era, and celebrated in popular culture since at least 2004.

== History ==
On April 19, 1943, Albert Hofmann ingested 0.25 milligrams (250 micrograms) of LSD (Albert Hofmann states in his autobiography that his first experience of the effects of LSD was on Friday, 16 April 1943. His experience on the 19th April was his first self-administered test of LSD.) Between one and two hours later, Hofmann experienced slow and gradual changes in his perception. He asked his laboratory assistant to escort him home. Due to wartime restrictions on automobile use, they made the journey by bicycle. On the way, Hofmann became anxious as objects in his field of vision wavered and distorted as if seen in a convex mirror. Upon arriving home, Hofmann's condition rapidly deteriorated as he struggled with feelings of anxiety, alternating in his beliefs that the next-door neighbour was a malevolent witch, that he was going insane, and that the LSD had poisoned him. When the house doctor arrived, however, he could detect no physical abnormalities, save for a pair of widely dilated pupils. Hofmann was reassured, and soon his terror began to give way to a sense of good fortune and enjoyment, as he later wrote:

... Little by little I could begin to enjoy the unprecedented colors and plays of shapes that persisted behind my closed eyes. Kaleidoscopic, fantastic images surged in on me, alternating, variegated, opening and then closing themselves in circles and spirals, exploding in colored fountains, rearranging and hybridizing themselves in constant flux ...

The events of this first LSD trip, now known as "Bicycle Day" in memory of Hofmann's bicycle ride home, proved to Hofmann that he had indeed made a significant discovery: a psychoactive substance with extraordinary potency, capable of causing significant shifts of consciousness in incredibly low doses. (The term trip was first coined by US Army scientists during the 1950s when they were experimenting with LSD.) Hofmann foresaw the drug as a powerful psychiatric tool; because of its intense and introspective nature, he could not imagine anyone using it recreationally. Bicycle Day is increasingly observed in psychedelic communities as a day to celebrate the discovery of LSD.

The celebration of Bicycle Day originated in DeKalb, Illinois, in 1985, when Thomas B. Roberts, then a professor at Northern Illinois University, coined the name "Bicycle Day" (Note: Dr. Hofmann asked Roberts why he had called it Bicycle Day instead of LSD Day: "I told him that the bicycle was a more concrete image than a chemical structure, and in America there is a famous poem (Paul Revere's Ride) that marks the start of our revolution in 1775 that makes a parallel with his ride...") when he hosted the first celebration at his home. Several years later, he sent an announcement made by one of his students to friends and online lists, thus propagating the idea and the celebration. His intent at the time was to commemorate Hofmann's original, accidental exposure on April 16, but that date fell midweek and was not a good time for the party, so he chose the 19th to honor Hofmann's first intentional exposure.
