= Harm Reduction Journal =

- Discipline: Harm reduction, addiction medicine
- Language: English
- Edited by: Nick Crofts, Euan Lawson

Publication details
- History: 2004–present
- Publisher: BioMed Central
- Impact factor: 4.362 (2020)

Standard abbreviations
- ISO 4: Harm Reduct. J.

Indexing
- ISSN: 1477-7517
- LCCN: 2004243422
- OCLC no.: 818986724

Links
- Journal homepage

Harm Reduction Journal is a peer-reviewed online-only medical journal covering harm reduction with respect to the use of psychoactive drugs. It was established in 2004 and is published by Springer Science+Business Media's BioMed Central imprint. It is affiliated with both Harm Reduction International and the Eurasian Harm Reduction Association. The editors-in-chief are Nick Crofts (University of Melbourne) and Euan Lawson (Lancaster University). According to the Journal Citation Reports, the journal has a 2020 impact factor of 4.362.
