= Tanaecium nocturnum =

Scientific classification
- Kingdom: Plantae
- Clade: Tracheophytes
- Clade: Angiosperms
- Clade: Eudicots
- Clade: Asterids
- Order: Lamiales
- Family: Bignoniaceae
- Genus: Tanaecium
- Species: T. nocturnum

Binomial name
- Tanaecium nocturnum (Barb.Rodr.) Bureau & K.Schum.

Species of plant

Tanaecium nocturnum (native name "kangara kane") is a species of flowering plant in the family Bignoniaceae, and is native to the Neotropics. Its white tubular flowers are 17 centimetres (6.7 in) long, and are pollinated by a hawkmoth with a tongue of similar length. It is used to calm bees when honey is being harvested.
