= Psychoactive plant =

Plants that induce psychotropic effects upon ingestion

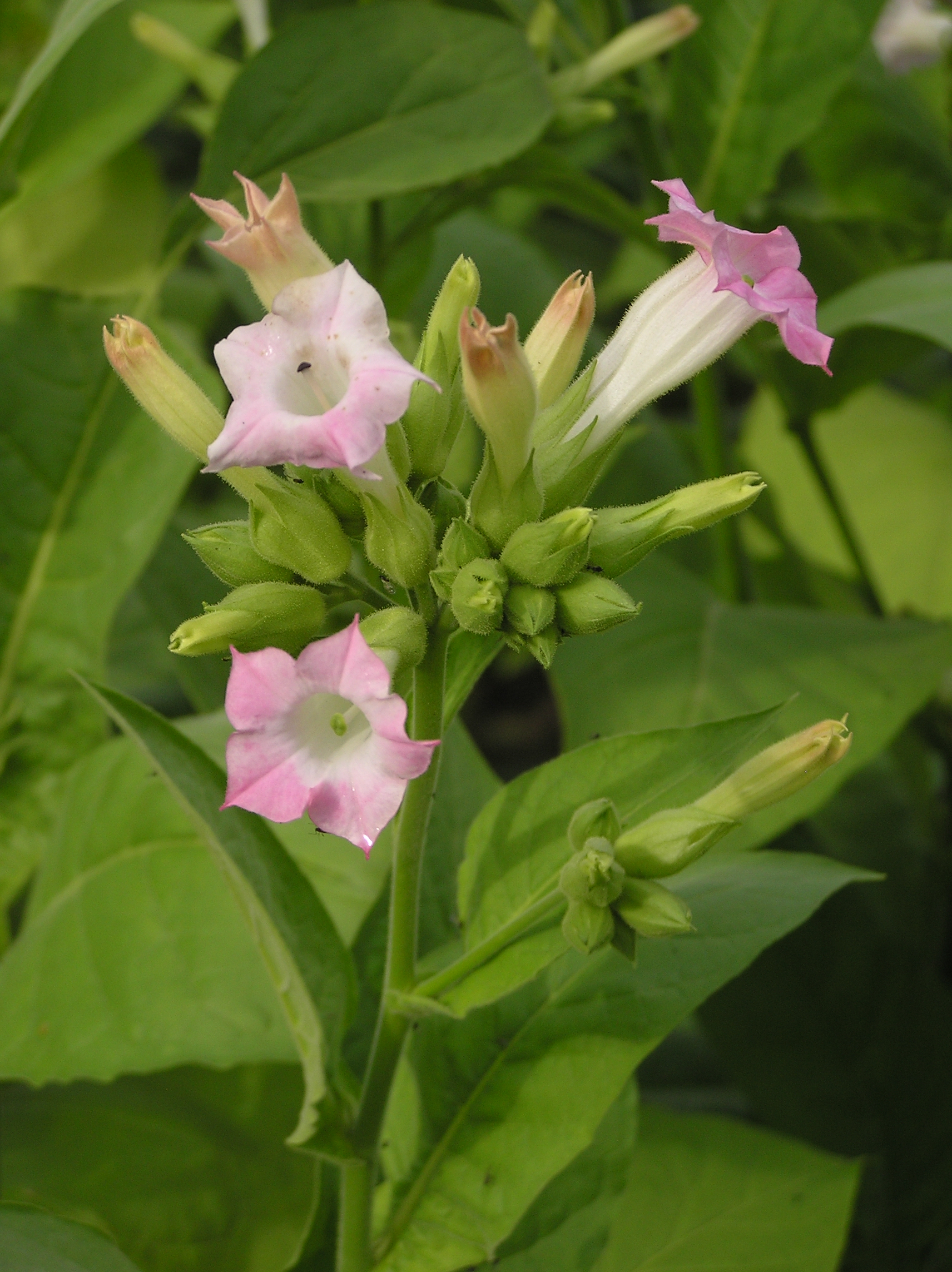
The tobacco plant (Nicotiana tabacum) is an example of a psychoactive plant. The active constituent is nicotine.

Psychoactive plants are plants, or preparations thereof, that upon ingestion induce psychotropic effects. As stated in a reference work:

Psychoactive plants are plants that people ingest in the form of simple or complex preparations in order to affect the mind or alter the state of consciousness.

Psychoactivity may include sedative, stimulant, euphoric, deliriant, and hallucinogenic effects.

Several hundred psychoactive plants are known. Some popular examples of psychoactive plants include Coffea arabica (coffee), Camellia sinensis (tea), Nicotiana tabacum (tobacco), and Cannabis (including hashish).

Psychoactive plants have been used ritually (e.g., peyote as an entheogen), medicinally (e.g., opium as an analgesic), and therapeutically (e.g., cannabis as a drug) for thousands of years. Hence, the sociocultural and economic significance of psychoactive plants is enormous.

== History of psychoactive plants ==
Many plants contain substances that alter moods and cause euphoria. Some of these psychoactive plants were known to the ancients. The history of poppy cultivation dates back to 3400 BC. In Mesopotamia. Poppies were cultivated by the Egyptians and then spread to India and China. Opium was widely used by Arab physicians around 1000 AD . Opium addiction was rampant in China, and after opium was banned in 1799, opium smuggling became a general industry, and in 1839, the Opium War broke out between Britain and China. The psychoactive plant Cannabis sativa (hemp plant) was already known in ancient China and India 5000 years ago. The earliest reference was found in a pharmacist's book from 2737 BC. It was written during the reign of Emperor Shennong of China. By 1000 AD, hemp products had spread to the Middle East and Africa. Cannabis probably came to South America in the 16th century. In the 19th century, cannabis was used medicinally due to its narcotic effects. Although many scientific articles on the therapeutic value of cannabis were published in Europe and America in the late 19th century, the use of cannabis in medicine declined significantly in the early 20th century.

== Examples of psychoactive plants ==
In the table below, a few examples of significant psychoactive plants and their effects are shown. For further examples, see List of psychoactive plants.

Examples of psychoactive plants
Plant	Common preparation	Main active constituent	Psychoactive effects
Coffea arabica	coffee	caffeine	stimulant, temporarily warding off drowsiness and restoring alertness
Nicotiana tabacum	tobacco	nicotine	stimulant, relaxant
Cannabis sativa	hashish	tetrahydrocannabinol	euphoria, relaxation, and increase in appetite
Erythroxylum coca	coca	cocaine	stimulant, appetite suppressant
Papaver somniferum	opium	morphine	analgesia, sedation, euphoria
Lophophora williamsii	peyote	mescaline	hallucinogen

== Botanical taxonomy ==
Botanical taxonomy delimits groups of plants and describes and names taxa based on these groups to identify other members of the same taxa. The circumscription of taxa is directed by the principles of classification, and the name assigned is governed by a code of nomenclature. In the plant kingdom (Plantae), almost all psychoactive plants are found within the flowering plants (angiosperms). There are many examples of psychoactive fungi, but fungi are not part of the plant kingdom. Some important plant families containing psychoactive species are listed below. The listed species are examples only, and a family may contain more psychoactive species than listed.

- Solanaceae (nightshades)
  - Nicotiana tabacum
  - Datura stramonium
- Rubiaceae
  - Coffea arabica
  - Mitragyna speciosa
  - Psychotria viridis
- Theaceae
  - Camellia sinensis
- Cannabaceae
  - Cannabis sativa
  - Cannabis indica
- Apocynaceae
  - Tabernanthe iboga
  - Voacanga africana
  - Tabernaemontana undulata
- Cactaceae
  - Lophophora williamsii
  - Echinopsis pachanoi
  - Echinopsis lageniformis
  - Echinopsis peruviana
  - Echinopsis scopulicola
- Papaveraceae
  - Papaver somniferum
- Erythroxylaceae
  - Erythroxylum coca
  - Erythroxylum novogranatense
- Celastraceae
  - Catha edulis
- Convolvulaceae
  - Ipomoea tricolor
- Lamiaceae
  - Salvia divinorum

== Phytochemistry ==
Phytochemistry is the study of phytochemicals, which are chemicals derived from plants. Phytochemists strive to describe the structures of the large number of secondary metabolites found in plants, the functions of these compounds in human and plant biology, and the biosynthesis of these compounds. Plants synthesize phytochemicals for many reasons, including to protect themselves against insect attacks and plant diseases. The compounds found in plants are of many kinds, but most can be grouped into four major biosynthetic classes: alkaloids, phenylpropanoids, polyketides, and terpenoids. Active constituents of the majority of psychoactive plants fall within the alkaloids (e.g., nicotine, morphine, cocaine, mescaline, caffeine, ephedrine), a class of nitrogen-containing natural products. Examples of psychoactive compounds of plant origin that do not contain nitrogen are tetrahydrocannabinol (a phytocannabinoid from Cannabis sativa) and salvinorin A (a diterpenoid from Salvia divinorum). Phytochemicals give plants their color, aroma and taste, and protect them from infectious diseases and predators. As explained in the next section, phytochemicals inhibit cancer cell growth, boost the immune system, and prevent damage to DNA that can lead to cancer and other diseases. This fact suggests that phytochemicals act as antioxidants to protect the body from oxidative damage caused by water, food, and air.

== See also ==
- List of psychoactive plants
- Phytochemistry
- Psychoactive cacti
- Psychoactive fungi
- Psychoactive drugs
- Ethnobotany
- Ethnopharmacology
- Christian Rätsch
- Richard Evans Schultes
- The Encyclopedia of Psychoactive Plants
