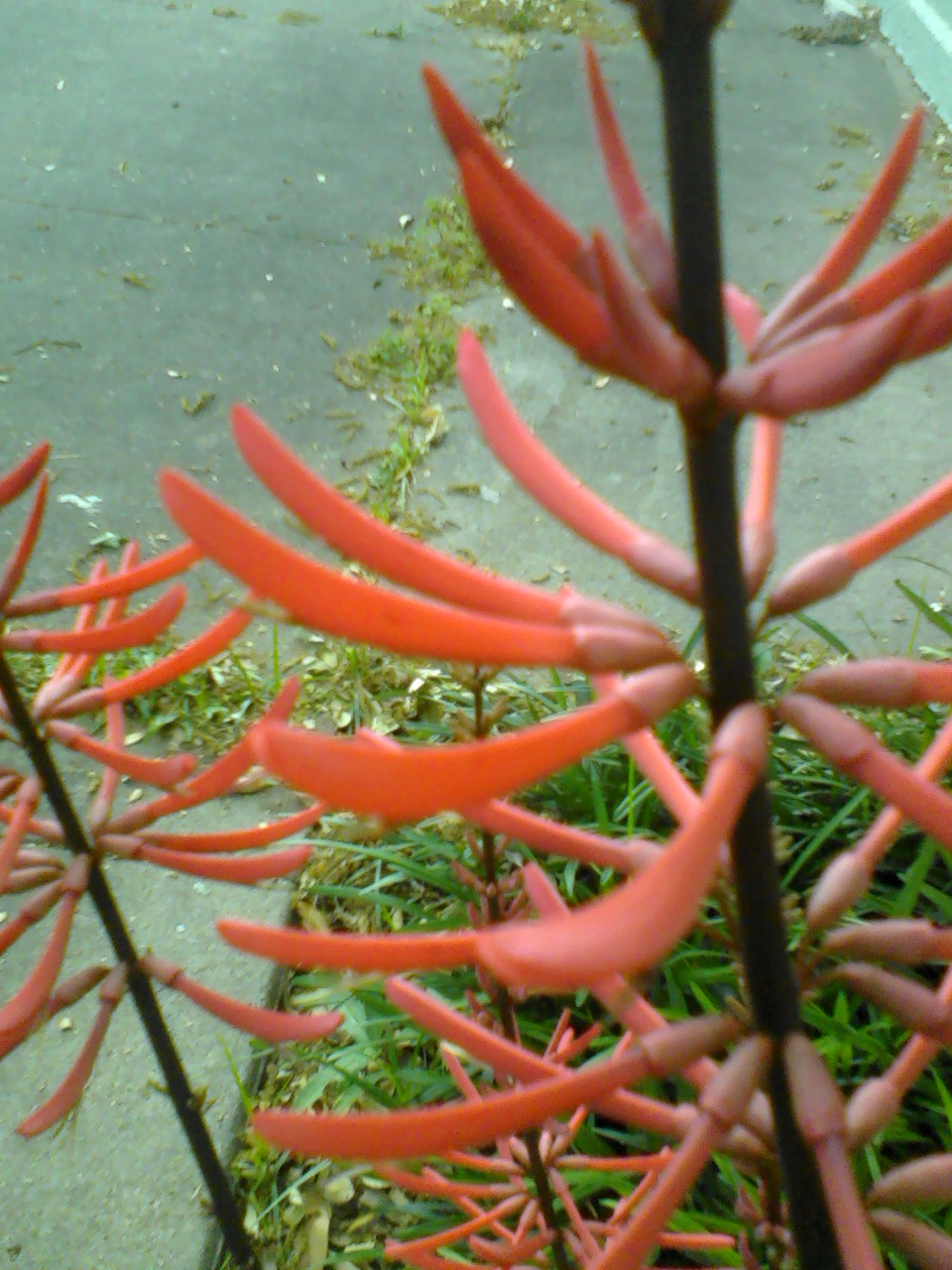
- Flowers

Scientific classification
- Kingdom: Plantae
- Clade: Tracheophytes
- Clade: Angiosperms
- Clade: Eudicots
- Clade: Rosids
- Order: Fabales
- Family: Fabaceae
- Subfamily: Faboideae
- Genus: Erythrina
- Species: E. americana

Binomial name
- Erythrina americana Mill.

Synonyms
- Corallodendron americanum (Mill.) Kuntze; Corallodendron coralloides (DC.) Kuntze; Erythrina carnea Aiton; Erythrina enneandra DC. Erythrina fulgens Loisel. Erythrina fulgens Lois.

= Erythrina americana =

Species of legume

Erythrina americana (coral tree, colorines, colorín, or pemoches), is a flowering plant of the genus Erythrina which is native to Mexico. Colorín (plural colorines) is the name of a type of tree, Erythrina americana also called Tzompāmitl. The word colorín means color chillón—a “gaudy” or “loud” color (Williams 1959).

Colorines plant, also called cuchillitos (little knives), machetitos (little machetes), zompantle, or coral, is a nice flower, red in color, and every individual flower resembles a little machete. The flower is edible and is boiled (only the red part of the flower) and cooked with scrambled eggs or tuna in many parts of south Mexico.

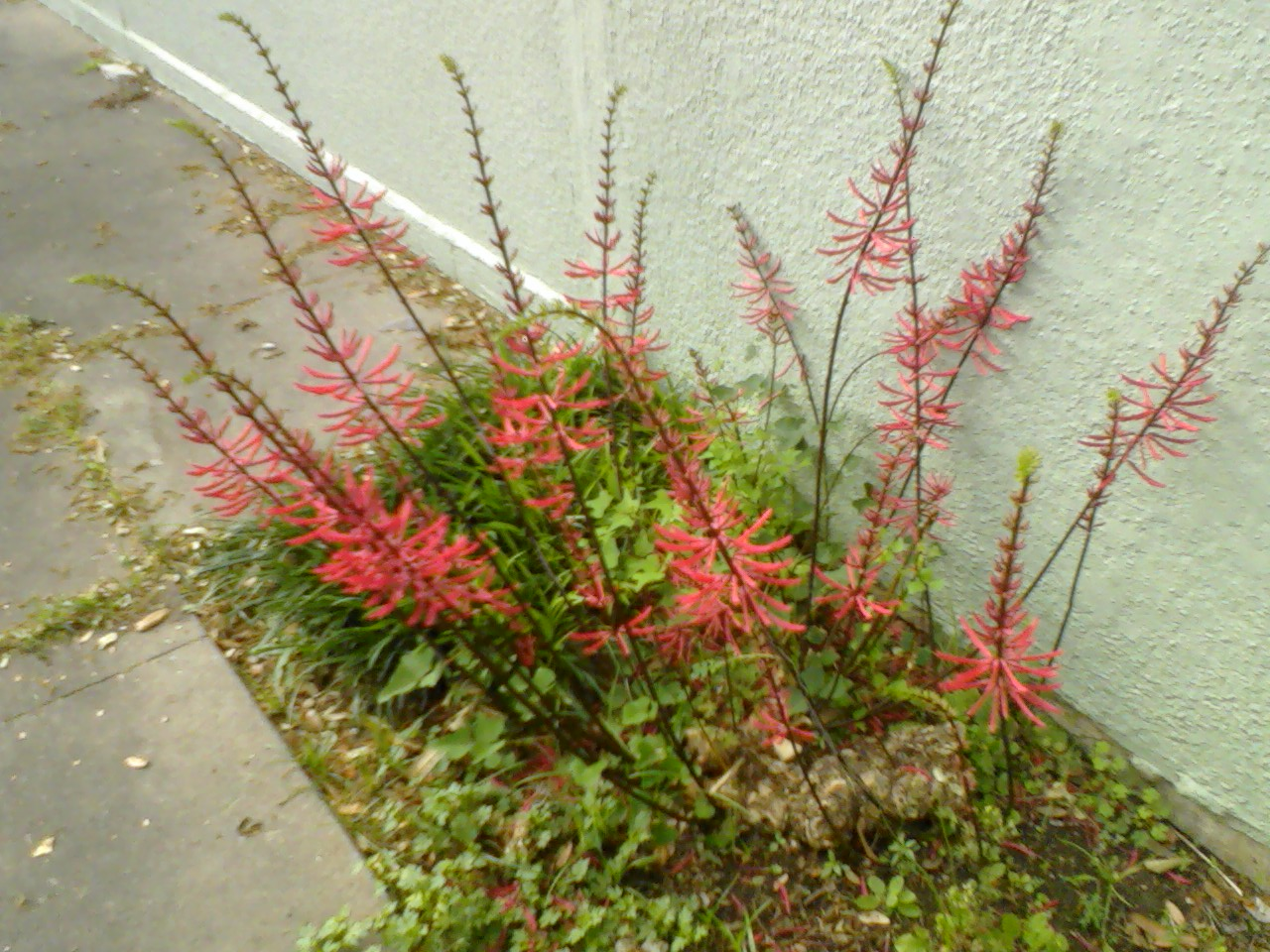
Colorines, machetitos machete Erythrina americana plant from Texas

This variety flowers during the dry season (April) in many parts, and the plant is very popular with hummingbirds because of the bright red color, the plant ranges from a few feet off the ground to trees five meters tall.

The earliest depiction of this tree in America is in the Florentine Codex. In the 17th century, Francisco Hernández commented: "The juice from the flowers of this tree, given to children induces drowsiness and sleepless".

Other sites explain that although the flower is edible, the seeds and everything else in the tree is highly toxic. In Mexico, the pulverized seeds are used as rat poison and the bark is used as fish poison.

== Description ==
E. americana is a tree that grows to 4-5m. It has pale, brown, smooth bark and a spreading and profusely branching crown. It sheds its leaves during winter and the dry season. Leaves are. It has spines on the branches and conical, flat spines on the trunk. Leaves are arranged alternately and are trifoliate with rhombic-ovate leaflets that are 7-22cm long and broad.

== Uses ==
The flower is edible, traditionally fried or added to eggs for omelets, or added to soups and salads. The leaves can also be used in salads, as long as they are tender. This tree is very popular with children, who use the flowers as little knives to stab each other. The tree is also used to make traditional crafts in many Mexican states, especially traditional dance masks. It can also be turned into and used as fence posts in many parts of Veracruz Mexico. It is a hardy tree, with some varieties even tolerating frost.

Medicinally, the plant has a variety of uses. The flowers are sedatives, though they are commonly eaten. The seeds are considered laxative, diuretic, expectorant, anti-asthmatic, and anti-malarial. However, they should be used cautiously due to their isoquinoline alkaloid content. Of their alkaloids, β-erythroidine and its more potent derivate dihydro-β-erythroidine were shown to possess curariform activity. The roots are considered sudorific and the leaves are considered emmenagogue.

The tall varieties of this plant are rarely used as a garden plant, but the dwarf varieties are used as garden plants because they tolerate frost, they tolerate heat and come from dry places, and they flower early and attract hummingbirds.

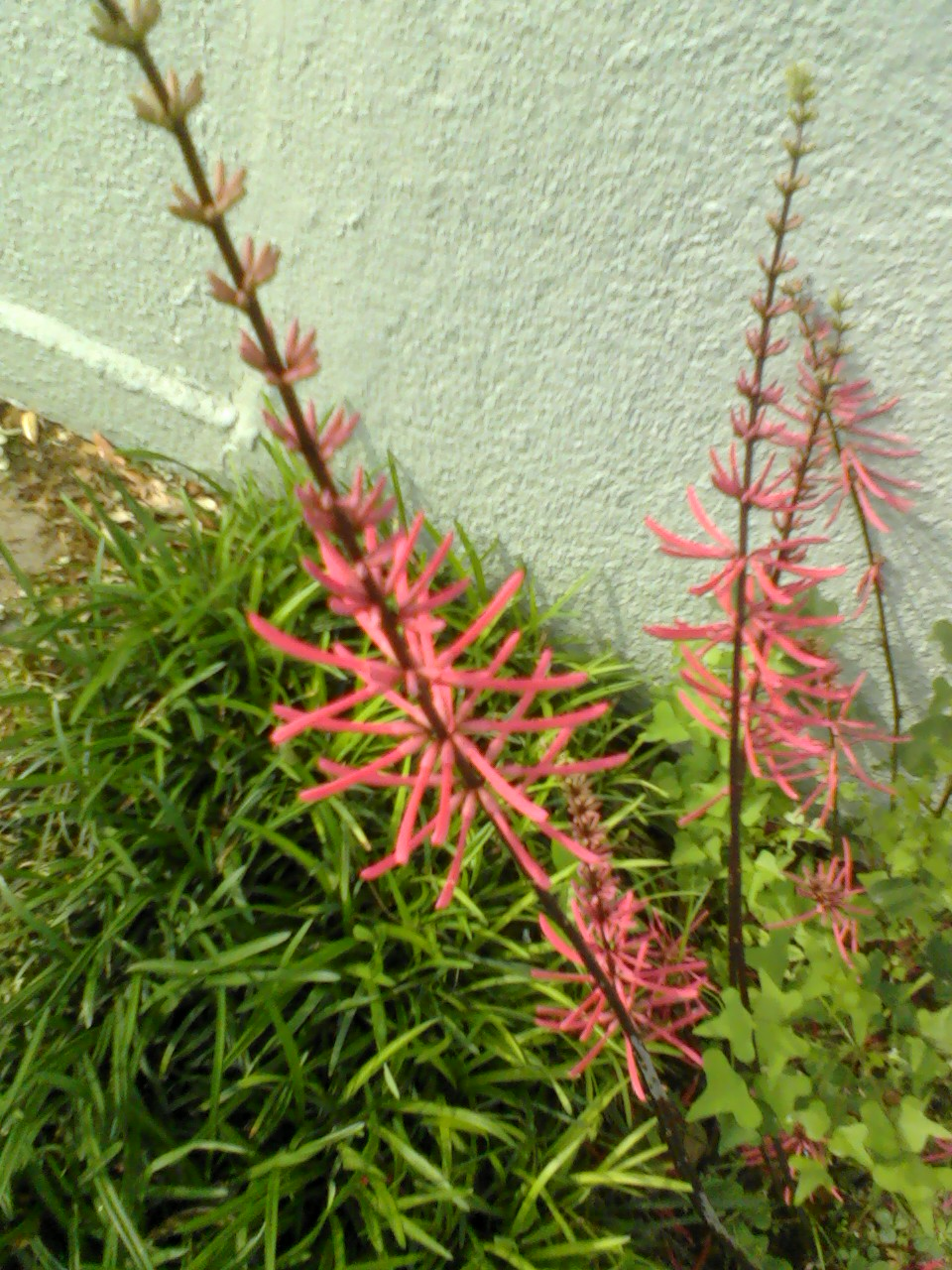
Colorines, machetitos machete Erythrina americana plant from Texas

== See also ==
- https://web.archive.org/web/20140407154001/http://www.medicinatradicionalmexicana.unam.mx/monografia.php?l=3&t=Erythrina%20americana&id=7174
- Media related to Erythrina americana at Wikimedia Commons
