= Richard Evans Schultes =

American ethnobotanist (1915–2001)

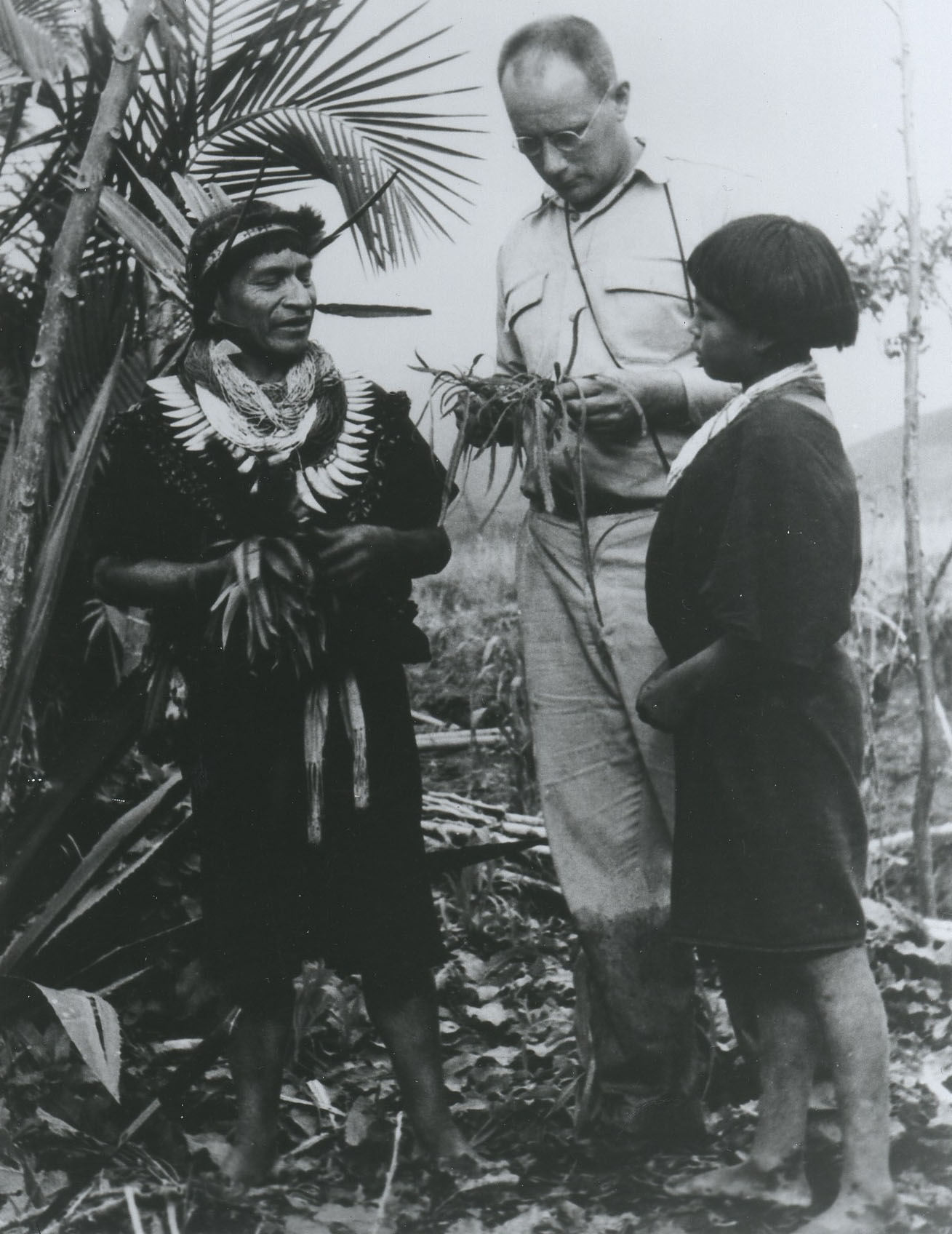
- In the Amazon, c. 1940
- Born: January 12, 1915; Boston, Massachusetts, U.S.
- Died: April 10, 2001 (aged 86); Boston, Massachusetts, U.S.
- Education: Harvard University
- Known for: Native American uses of entheogenic, hallucinogenic plants; finding source of curare; campaigning for rainforest
- Awards: · Gold Medal - Linnean Society of London · Gold Medal - World Wildlife Fund · The Cross of Boyaca
- Scientific career
- Fields: Ethnobotany
- Workplaces: Harvard University
- Doctoral advisor: Oakes Ames
- Doctoral students: Michael J. Balick
- Author abbrev. (botany): R.E.Schult.

Richard Evans Schultes (SHULL-tees; January 12, 1915 – April 10, 2001) was an American biologist, considered to be the father of modern ethnobotany. He is known for his studies of the uses of plants by indigenous peoples, especially the indigenous peoples of the Americas. He worked on entheogenic or hallucinogenic plants, particularly in Mexico and the Amazon, involving lifelong collaborations with chemists. He had charismatic influence as an educator at Harvard University; several of his students and colleagues went on to write popular books and assume influential positions in museums, botanical gardens, and popular culture.

His book Plants of the Gods: Origins of Hallucinogenic Use (1979), co-authored with chemist Albert Hofmann, the discoverer of LSD, is considered his greatest popular work: it has never been out of print and was revised into an expanded second edition, based on a German translation by Christian Rätsch (1998), in 2001.

== Early life and education ==
Schultes was born in Boston, Massachusetts, on January 12, 1915. The son of a plumber, he grew up and was educated in East Boston. His interest in South America's rain forests traced back to his childhood: while he was bedridden, his parents read him excerpts of Notes of a Botanist on the Amazon and the Andes, by the 19th-century English botanist Richard Spruce. He received a full scholarship to Harvard.

In 1933, Schultes entered Harvard University, where he planned to pursue medicine. However, that changed after he took Biology 104, "Plants and Human Affairs," taught by orchidologist and Director of the Harvard Botanical Museum Oakes Ames, and after reading Heinrich Klüver's 1928 book Mescal: The 'Divine' Plant and Its Psychological Effects. Ames became a mentor, and Schultes became an assistant in the Botanical Museum; his undergraduate senior thesis studied the ritual use of peyote cactus among the Kiowa of Oklahoma, obtaining a degree in biology in 1937.

Continuing at Harvard under Ames, he completed his Master of Arts in biology in 1938 and his Ph.D. in botany in 1941. Schultes' doctoral thesis investigated the lost identity of the Mexican hallucinogenic plants teonanácatl mushrooms belonging to the genus Psilocybe, and ololiuqui, a morning glory species, in Oaxaca, Mexico. He received a fellowship from the National Research Council to study the plants used to make curare.

== Career ==
The entry of the United States into World War II in 1941 saw Schultes diverted to the search for wild disease-resistant Hevea rubber species in an effort to free the U.S. from dependence on Southeast Asia's rubber plantations which had become unavailable owing to Japanese occupation.

In early 1942, as a field agent for the governmental Rubber Development Corporation, Schultes began work on rubber and concurrently undertook research on Amazonian ethnobotany, under a Guggenheim Foundation Fellowship.

"The ethnobotanical researcher...must realize that far from being a superior individual, he - the civilized man - is in many respects far inferior...."
— Richard Schultes reflecting on his experiences with indigenous peoples

Schultes' botanical field-work among aboriginal American communities led him to be one of the first to alert the world about destruction of the Amazon rain-forest and the disappearance of its native people. He collected over thirty thousand herbarium specimens (including three hundred species new to Western science) and published numerous ethnobotanical discoveries including the source of the dart poison known as curare, now commonly employed as a muscle relaxant during surgery. He was the first non-native individual to academically examine ayahuasca, a hallucinogenic brew made out of Banisteriopsis caapi vine in combination with various plants; of which he identified Psychotria viridis (Chacruna) and Diplopterys cabrerana (Chaliponga), both of which contained a potent short-acting hallucinogen, dimethyltryptamine (DMT). In his travels he lived with the indigenous peoples and viewed them with respect and felt that tribal chiefs were gentlemen; he understood the languages of the Witoto and Makuna peoples. He encountered dangers in his travels, including hunger, beriberi, repeated bouts of malaria, and near drowning.

Schultes became curator of Harvard's Oakes Ames Orchid Herbarium in 1953, curator of Economic Botany in 1958, and professor of biology in 1970. His undergraduate course on economic botany was noted for his Victorian demeanor, lectures delivered in a white lab coat, insistence on memorization of systematic botanical names, films depicting native ritual use of plant inebriants, blowgun demonstrations, and hands-on labs (using plant sources of grain, paper, caffeine, dyes, medicines, and tropical fruits). Schultes was a captivating raconteur and would entertain his undergraduate students with stories of his adventures; in one such narrative he explained to Bolivian-born undergrad Fernando Gonzalez Sfeir that even though Schultes was physically in Cambridge, Massachusetts, legally speaking and according to his passport he is still in Bolivia, as having entered that country through the normal immigration process, he had to make an emergency exit from that country's Amazon jungle and enter neighboring Brazil to escape bandits who were pursuing him.

In 1959, Schultes married Dorothy Crawford McNeil, an opera soprano who performed in Europe and the United States. They had three children, Richard Evans Schultes II, and twins Alexandra Ames Schultes Wilson and Neil Parker Schultes. Schultes retired from Harvard in 1985. He was a member of King's Chapel church in Boston. Despite his Germanic surname he was an anglophile. He would often vote for the Queen of the United Kingdom during presidential elections because he didn't support the American Revolution.

== Influences ==
Schultes was led to study psychoactive drugs by Heinrich Kluver, a leading scholar of this subject (personal communication from Schultes). This interest evolved by way of Schultes' field observations on peyote, studying the peyote cult among the Plains Indians in his travels with Weston LaBarre in the early 1930s (in 1938, LaBarre based The Peyote Cult on these travels and observations).

In Western culture, Schultes' discoveries influenced writers who considered hallucinogens as the gateways to self-discovery, such as Aldous Huxley, William Burroughs and Carlos Castaneda. Although he contributed to the psychedelic era with his discoveries, he personally disdained its proponents, dismissing drug guru and fellow Harvard professor Timothy Leary for being so little versed in hallucinogenic species that he misspelled the Latin names of the plants. When Burroughs described his ayahuasca visions as an earth-shaking metaphysical experience, Schultes famously replied, "That's funny, Bill, all I saw was colors."

Schultes' personal hero was Richard Spruce, a British naturalist who spent seventeen years exploring the Amazon rainforest.

Schultes, in both his life and his work, has directly influenced notable people as diverse as biologist E.O. Wilson, physician Andrew Weil, psychologist Daniel Goleman, ethnobotanist, researcher and writer Jonathan Ott, poet Allen Ginsberg, ethnobotanist, conservationist and author Mark Plotkin, and authors Alejo Carpentier, Mary Mackey, and William S. Burroughs. Timothy Plowman, authority on the genus Erythroxylum (coca) and ethnobotanist, and Wade Davis were his students at Harvard.

== Distinctions ==
Schultes received numerous awards and decorations including:

- Gold Medal from the Linnean Society of London (1992), the most prestigious prize in botany;
- Gold Medal from the World Wildlife Fund;
- Golden Plate Award of the American Academy of Achievement (1988);
- Boyaca Cross (Cruz de Boyacá) 1986, highest award from the government of the Republic Of Colombia.

Schultes is one of the leading characters in the prestigious Colombian film El abrazo de la serpiente (Embrace of the Serpent) (2015), directed by Ciro Guerra and critically acclaimed. The film depicts Schultes' search for a mysterious plant through the Amazon jungle, and he was played by actor Brionne Davis. The film specifically credits both his diaries and those accounts of an earlier Amazonian explorer, the German scientist Theodor Koch-Grünberg.

In 1962, botanist Harold E. Moore published Resia, which is a genus of flowering plants from South America, in the family Gesneriaceae and named in his honour. Then in 1977, botanist Hunz. published Schultesianthus which is also a genus of flowering plants from South America, but belonging to the family Solanaceae and also named in Moore's honour.

== Selected works ==
=== Books ===
- Schultes, Richard Evans; Hofmann, Albert (1973). The Botany and Chemistry of Hallucinogens. Springfield, Illinois: Thomas. ISBN 978-0-398-02401-7. OCLC 628131. OL 5334409M.
- Schultes, Richard Evans (1976). Hallucinogenic Plants. A Golden Guide. Vol. 35. Elmer W. Smith (illustrator). New York: Golden Press. ISBN 0-307-24362-1.
- Schultes, Richard Evans; Albert Hofmann (1979). Plants of the Gods: Origins of Hallucinogenic Use. New York: McGraw-Hill. ISBN 0-07-056089-7.
- Schultes, Richard Evans; William A. Davis, with Hillel Burger (1982). The Glass Flowers at Harvard. New York: Dutton. ISBN 0-525-93250-X.
- Schultes, Richard Evans (1988). Where the Gods Reign: Plants and Peoples of the Colombian Amazon. Oracle, Ariz.: Synergetic Press. ISBN 0-907791-13-1.
- Schultes, Richard Evans; Robert F. Raffauf (1990). The Healing Forest: Medicinal and Toxic Plants of the Northwest Amazonia. Portland, Or.: Dioscorides Press. ISBN 0-931146-14-3.
- Schultes, Richard Evans; Robert F. Raffauf (1992). Vine of the Soul: Medicine Men, Their Plants and Rituals in the Colombian Amazonia. Oracle, Ariz.: Synergetic Press. ISBN 0-907791-24-7.
- Schultes, Richard Evans; Siri von Reis, eds. (1995). Ethnobotany: Evolution of a Discipline. Portland, Or.: Dioscorides Press. ISBN 0-931146-28-3.

=== Journal articles ===
- Schultes, R. E. (1937). "Peyote (Lophophora Williamsii) and Plants Confused with It". Botanical Museum Leaflets, Harvard University. 5 (5): 61–88. JSTOR 41762659.
- Schultes, R. E. (1940). "Teonanacatl: The Narcotic Mushroom of the Aztecs" (PDF). American Anthropologist. 42 (3): 429–443. doi:10.1525/aa.1940.42.3.02a00040. JSTOR 663232.
- Schultes, R. E. (1966). "The Search for New Natural Hallucinogens". Lloydia. 29: 293–308.
- Schultes RE (January 1969). "Hallucinogens of Plant Origin". Science. 163 (3864): 245–254. doi:10.1126/science.163.3864.245. PMID 4883616.
- Schultes, R E (1970). "The Botanical and Chemical Distribution of Hallucinogens" (PDF). Annual Review of Plant Physiology. 21 (1): 571–598. doi:10.1146/annurev.pp.21.060170.003035. ISSN 0066-4294.
- Schultes, Richard Evans; Farnsworth, Norman R (1980). "Ethnomedical, Botanical and Phytochemical Aspects of Natural Hallucinogens". Botanical Museum Leaflets, Harvard University. 28 (2): 123–214. doi:10.5962/p.168645. ISSN 0006-8098. JSTOR 41762829.
- Schultes, Richard Evans (1984). "Psychoactive Plants in Need of Chemical and Pharmacological Study". Proceedings / Indian Academy of Sciences. 93 (3): 281–304. doi:10.1007/BF03053083. ISSN 0370-0097.

=== Book chapters ===
- Schultes, R. E. (1972). "An Overview of Hallucinogens in the Western Hemisphere" (PDF). In Furst, Peter T. (ed.). Flesh of the Gods: The Ritual Use of Hallucinogens. New York: Praeger Publishers. pp. 3–54.
- Schultes, R. E. (1981). "Phytochemical Gaps in Our Knowledge of Hallucinogens". In Reinhold, L.; Harborne, J. B.; Swain, T. (eds.). Progress in Phytochemistry. Vol. 7. Pergamon Press. pp. 301–332. ISBN 0-08-026362-3. ISSN 0079-6689. LCCN 68-24347.

=== Others ===
- Schultes, R. E. (1941). A Contribution to Our Knowledge of Rivea corymbosa: The Narcotic Ololiuqui of the Aztecs (PDF). Cambridge, Massachusetts: Botanical Museum of Harvard University.

== See also ==
- Ethnobiology
- Psychoactive plants
- List of psychoactive plants
