= Christian Rätsch =

German anthropologist (1957–2022)

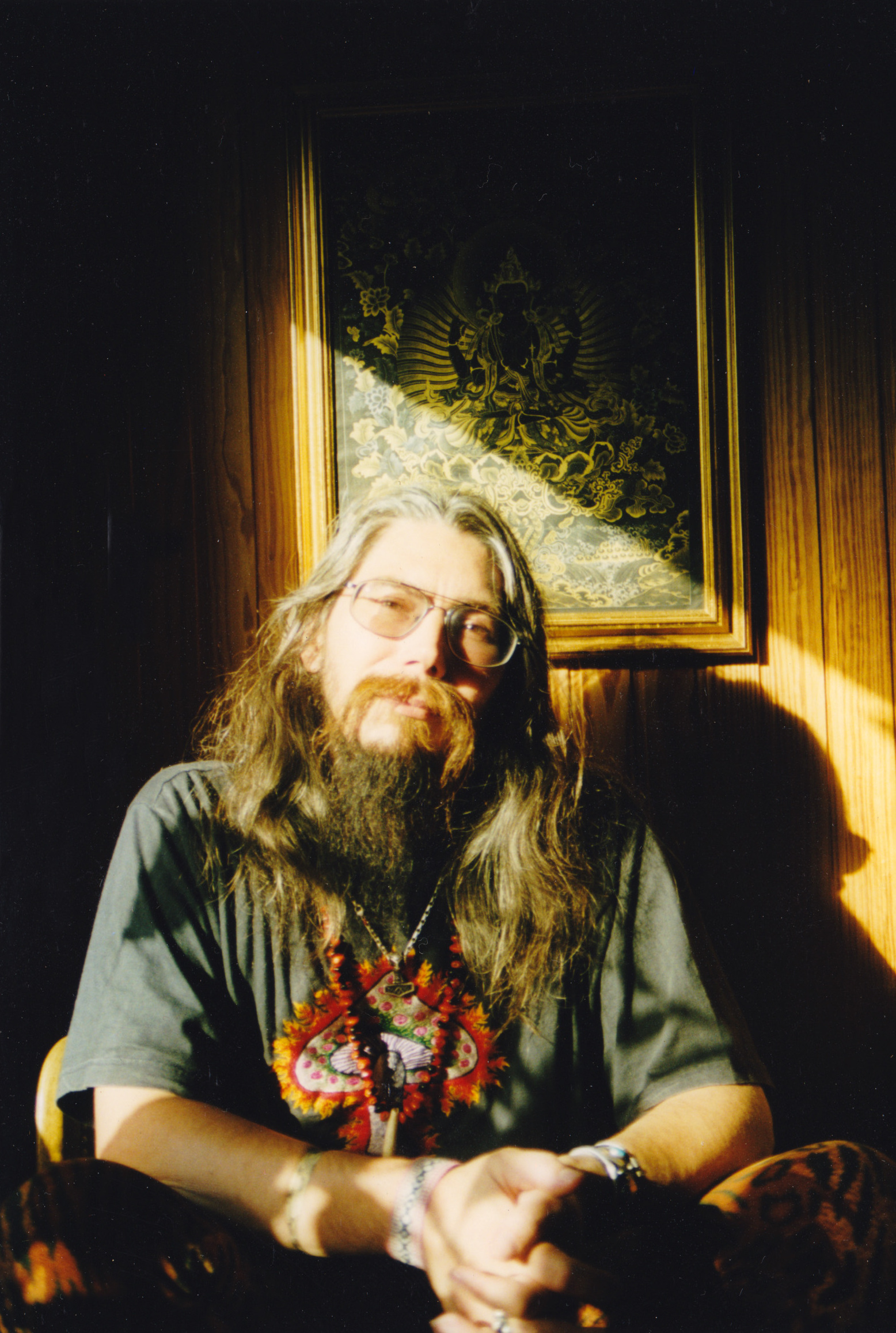
- Christian Rätsch in 1999
- Born: 20 April 1957
- Died: 17 September 2022 (aged 65)
- Occupation: Anthropologist
- Notable work: The Encyclopedia of Psychoactive Plants (1998/2005)

Christian Rätsch (20 April 1957 – 17 September 2022) was a German anthropologist and writer on topics like ethnopharmacology and psychoactive plants, fungi, and animals.

== Life ==
Rätsch was born in 1957 in a Bohemian community in Hamburg, Germany. His father was an opera singer, his mother a ballet dancer. He started learning about shamanism and sacred plants at 10 and had his first drug experience at 12.

Rätsch earned a doctorate in Native American cultures. He conducted field research for three years while living with the Lacandón Indians in Chiapas, Mexico investigating shamanism first-hand, and completed his doctorate on their incantations and spells. Rätsch resided in Hamburg with his wife Claudia Müller-Ebeling. He is the founder and co-editor of The Yearbook of Ethnomedicine and the Study of Consciousness.

Rätsch died at the age of 65 from an undiscovered stomach ulcer, which he had staunchly tamed over the years.

== Selected works ==
=== The Encyclopedia of Psychoactive Plants ===
Christian Rätsch's The Encyclopedia of Psychoactive Plants: Ethnopharmacology and Its Applications (Enzyklopädie der Psychoaktiven Pflanzen: Botanik, Ethnopharmakologie und Anwendung) describes the botany, history, distribution, cultivation, preparation, and dosage of more than 400 psychoactive plants (while not actually plants, the encyclopedia also includes psychoactive fungi). The encyclopedia also offers information on ritual and medicinal use (see also ethnopharmacology). The encyclopedia features 168 detailed monographs on the major psychoactive plants (e.g., Cannabis, Datura, and Papaver) as well as 20 full monographs on psychoactive fungi (e.g., Psilocybe and Amanita).

== Bibliography ==
- Schultes, Richard Evans; Hofmann, Albert; Rätsch, Christian (1998). Pflanzen der Götter: Die magischen Kräfte der bewusstseinserweiternden Gewächse [Plants of the Gods: The Magical Powers of Mind-Altering Plants] (Translated and revised ed.). Aarau: AT-Verlag. ISBN 978-3-85502-645-6.
- Schultes, Richard Evans; Hofmann, Albert; Rätsch, Christian (2001). Plants of the Gods: Their Sacred, Healing, and Hallucinogenic Powers (Revised and expanded ed.). Rochester, Vermont: Healing Arts Press. ISBN 978-0-89281-979-9.
- Müller-Ebeling, Claudia and Christian Rätsch and Surendra Bahadur Shahi (2002). Shamanism and Tantra in the Himalayas. Transl. by Annabel Lee. Rochester, Vt.: Inner Traditions International.
- Rätsch, Christian (2005) [1998]. The Encyclopedia of Psychoactive Plants: Ethnopharmacology and Its Applications. Rochester, Vermont: Park Street Press. ISBN 978-0-89281-978-2.
- Marijuana Medicine: A World Tour of the Healing and Visionary Powers of Cannabis Paperback – by Christian Rätsch - March 1, 2001
- Müller-Ebeling, Claudia, Christian Rätsch and Arno Adaalars (2016). Ayahuasca: Rituals, Potions and Visionary Art from the Amazon. Published by Divine Arts. ISBN 9781611250510
- Markus Berger and Christian Rätsch (2022). Enzyklopädie der psychoaktiven Pflanzen – Band 2. AT Verlag.

== See also ==
- Richard Evans Schultes
- Christophe Wiart
- Dennis McKenna
- Terence McKenna
- List of psychoactive plants
