= Albert Hofmann =

Swiss chemist (1906–2008)

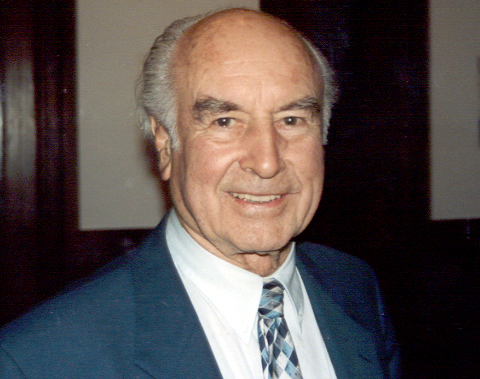
- Hofmann in 1993
- Born: 11 January 1906; Baden, Aargau, Switzerland
- Died: 29 April 2008 (aged 102); Burg im Leimental, Basel-Landschaft, Switzerland
- Education: University of Zurich (PhD)
- Occupations: Chemist; author
- Employer: Sandoz
- Known for: Discovery of LSD-25. Isolating, naming and synthesizing psilocybin and psilocin, as well as synthesizing various analogs thereof.
- Spouse: Anita Guanella (m. 1935; died 2007)
- Children: 4
- Relatives: Gustav Guanella (brother-in-law)
- Awards: Scheele Award

Albert Hofmann (11 January 1906 – 29 April 2008) was a Swiss chemist known for being the first to synthesize, ingest, and learn of the psychedelic effects of lysergic acid diethylamide (LSD). Hofmann's team also isolated, named and synthesized the principal psychedelic mushroom compounds psilocybin and psilocin. Hofmann discovered the structure of chitin in 1929. He authored more than 100 scientific articles and numerous books, including LSD: Mein Sorgenkind (LSD: My Problem Child).

== Early life and education ==
Albert Hofmann was born in Baden, Switzerland, on 11 January 1906. He was the first of four children to factory toolmaker Adolf Hofmann and Elisabeth (née Schenk) and was baptized Protestant. When his father became ill, Hofmann obtained a position as a commercial apprentice in concurrence with his studies. Owing to his father's low income, Albert's godfather paid for his education. At age 20, Hofmann began his study of chemistry with Paul Karrer at the University of Zurich. Hofmann's main interest was the chemistry of plants and animals. He earned his doctorate with distinction in just four years for research on the chemical structure of the animal substance chitin in 1929. He married Anita Guanella in 1935.

== Career ==
Of his decision to pursue a career as a chemist, Hofmann provided insight during a speech he delivered to the 1996 Worlds of Consciousness Conference in Heidelberg, Germany:

One often asks oneself what roles planning and chance play in the realization of the most important events in our lives. [...] This [career] decision was not easy for me. I had already taken a Latin matricular exam, and therefore a career in the humanities stood out most prominently in the foreground. Moreover, an artistic career was tempting. In the end, however, it was a problem of theoretical knowledge which induced me to study chemistry, which was a great surprise to all who knew me. Mystical experiences in childhood, in which Nature was altered in magical ways, had provoked questions concerning the essence of the external, material world, and chemistry was the scientific field which might afford insights into this.

=== Discovery of LSD ===
In 1929, Hofmann became an employee of the pharmaceutical and chemical department of Sandoz Laboratories as a coworker of Arthur Stoll, founder and director of the pharmaceutical department. He began studying the medicinal plant Drimia maritima (squill) and the fungus ergot as part of a program to purify and synthesize active constituents for use as pharmaceuticals. His main contribution was to elucidate the chemical structure of the common nucleus of the Scilla glycosides (an active principle of Mediterranean squill). While researching lysergic acid derivatives, Hofmann first synthesized LSD on 16 November 1938. The main intention of the synthesis was to obtain a respiratory and circulatory stimulant (analeptic) with no effects on the uterus in analogy to nikethamide (which is also a diethylamide) by introducing this functional group to lysergic acid. It was set aside for five years, until 16 April 1943, when Hofmann reexamined it and accidentally discovered its powerful effects. He described what he felt as being:

... affected by a remarkable restlessness, combined with a slight dizziness. At home I lay down and sank into a not unpleasant intoxicated[-]like condition, characterized by an extremely stimulated imagination. In a dreamlike state, with eyes closed (I found the daylight to be unpleasantly glaring), I perceived an uninterrupted stream of fantastic pictures, extraordinary shapes with intense, kaleidoscopic play of colors. After some two hours this condition faded away.

Three days later, on 19 April 1943, Hofmann intentionally ingested 250 micrograms of LSD, which he thought would represent a prudently safe, small amount, but was in fact a strong dose. At first, his trip was not pleasant, as people appeared to morph into fantastic creatures, furniture moved and shifted like living entities, and he felt possessed by otherworldly forces.

19 April is now widely known as Bicycle Day, because as Hofmann began to feel LSD's effects, he tried to ride to the safety of his home on his bike. This was the first intentional LSD trip in history.

Hofmann's research with LSD influenced several psychiatrists, including Ronald A. Sandison, who developed its use in psychotherapy. Sandison's treatment at Powick Hospital in England received international acclaim.

Hofmann continued to take small doses of LSD throughout his life, and always hoped to find a use for it. In his memoir, he emphasized it as a "sacred drug": "I see the true importance of LSD in the possibility of providing material aid to meditation aimed at the mystical experience of a deeper, comprehensive reality."

=== Further research ===
It gave me an inner joy, an open mindedness, a gratefulness, open eyes and an internal sensitivity for the miracles of creation. ... I think that in human evolution it has never been as necessary to have this substance LSD. It is just a tool to turn us into what we are supposed to be.

— Albert Hofmann, Speech on 100th birthday

Hofmann later discovered 4-AcO-DET, a hallucinogenic tryptamine. He first synthesized 4-AcO-DET in 1958 in the Sandoz lab. Hofmann became director of Sandoz's natural products department and continued studying hallucinogenic substances found in Mexican mushrooms and other plants used by Indigenous peoples there. This led to the isolation and synthesis of psilocybin, the active agent of many "magic mushrooms". Hofmann also became interested in the seeds of the Mexican morning glory species Turbina corymbosa, called ololiuqui by natives. He was surprised to find the active compound of ololiuqui, ergine (LSA, lysergic acid amide), to be closely related to LSD. This discovery is said to have initially been met with "a state of disbelief bordering on accusations of scientific fraud", but was soon confirmed by other researchers.

In 1962, Hofmann and his wife Anita Hofmann traveled to Mexico at the invitation of the ethnomycologist R. Gordon Wasson to search for the psychoactive plant "Ska Maria Pastora" (Leaves of Mary the Shepherdess), later known as Salvia divinorum. He was able to obtain samples of it, but never succeeded in identifying its active compound, which has since been identified as salvinorin A. In 1963, Hofmann attended the annual convention of the World Academy of Arts and Sciences (WAAS) in Stockholm.

== Later years ==
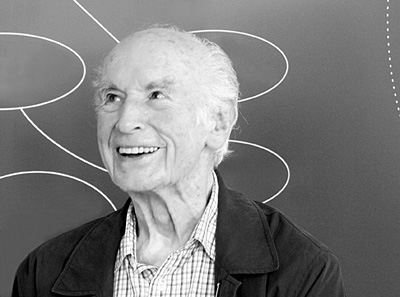
Albert Hofmann in 2006

Interviewed shortly before his 100th birthday, Hofmann called LSD "medicine for the soul" and was frustrated by its worldwide prohibition. "It was used very successfully for ten years in psychoanalysis", he said, adding that the drug was misused by the counterculture of the 1960s and then unfairly criticized by the political establishment of the day. He conceded that it could be dangerous if misused, because a relatively high dose of 500 micrograms has an extremely powerful psychoactive effect, especially if administered to a first-time user without adequate supervision.

In December 2007, Swiss medical authorities allowed psychotherapist Peter Gasser to perform psychotherapeutic experiments on patients with terminal-stage cancer and other terminal diseases. Completed in 2011, these represent the first study of the therapeutic effects of LSD on humans in 35 years; other studies had examined the drug's effects on consciousness and body. Hofmann acclaimed the study and reiterated his belief in LSD's therapeutic benefits. In 2008, he wrote to Steve Jobs, asking him to support this research; it is not known whether Jobs responded. The Multidisciplinary Association for Psychedelic Studies (MAPS) has supported psychoanalytic research using LSD, carrying on Hofmann's legacy and setting the groundwork for future studies.

Hofmann was a longtime friend and correspondent of German author and entomologist Ernst Jünger, whom he met in 1949. Jünger experimented with LSD with Hofmann; in 1970, Jünger published a book of his experiences taking several types of drugs, Approaches: Drugs and Intoxication (German: Annäherungen. Drogen und Rausch).

== Archives ==
After retiring from Sandoz in 1971, Hofmann was allowed to take his papers and research home. He gave his archive to the Albert Hofmann Foundation, a Los Angeles–based nonprofit, but the documents mostly sat in storage for years. The archives were sent to the San Francisco area in 2002 to be digitized, but that process was never completed. In 2013, the archive was sent to the Institute of Medical History in Bern, Switzerland, where it is being organized. According to Beat Bächi, who has been researching the estate at the Institute as part of a Swiss National Science Foundation (SNSF) research project, LSD, as a drug, was something for the cultural elite in Hofmann's opinion.

== Death ==
Hofmann died at the age of 102 from a heart attack, on 29 April 2008, in Switzerland.

== Honors and awards ==
The Swiss Federal Institute of Technology (ETH Zurich) honored him with the title DSc (honoris causa) in 1969 together with Gustav Guanella, his brother-in-law. In 1971 the Swedish Pharmaceutical Association granted him the Scheele Award, which commemorates the skills and achievements of the Swedish Pomerania chemist and pharmacist Carl Wilhelm Scheele.

== Publications ==
=== Books ===
- Schultes, Richard Evans; Hofmann, Albert (1973). The Botany and Chemistry of Hallucinogens. Springfield, Illinois: Thomas. ISBN 978-0-398-02401-7. OCLC 628131. OL 5334409M.
- Schultes RE, Hofmann A (1979). Plants of the Gods: Origins of Hallucinogenic Use. New York: McGraw-Hill. ISBN 978-0-07-056089-5. OCLC 6190695. OL 4409978M. Archive URL.
- Hofmann, Albert (1964). Die Mutterkornalkaloide (in German). Stuttgart: Ferdinand Enke Verlag.
- Hofmann, Albert (1980). LSD, My Problem Child. Translated by Jonathan Ott. McGraw-Hill. ISBN 978-0-07-029325-0. OCLC 6251390. OL 4100124M.
- Einsichten und Ausblicke (Essays). Basel: Sphinx Verlag (1986); ISBN 3-85914-633-5.

=== Public speaking ===
- "Transcript of a Special Videotaped Message From Albert Hofmann to the Participants at the April 16 & 17, 1993 Symposiums on the 50th Anniversary of his Discovery of LSD." MAPS | Multidisciplinary Association for Psychedelic Studies, vol. 4, no. 2 (Summer 1993), p. 56.

== Documentaries ==
Documentaries about or featuring Hofmann include:

- The Beyond Within: The Rise of LSD and The Fall of LSD (1986) (Everyman)
- LSD und sein Entdecker Albert Hofmann (LSD and Its Discoverer Albert Hofmann) (1993)
- Albert Hofmann (1993) (Das Sonntagsinterview)
- Narrenschwämme – von Pilzen, Gordon Wasson und anderen Sonderlingen (Magic Mushrooms – From Mushrooms, Gordon Wasson and Other Eccentrics [The Mushroom Man]) (1996)
- Hofmann's Potion: The Pioneers of LSD (2002)
- The Substance: Albert Hofmann's LSD (2011)

== See also ==
- History of LSD
- Drug design
- Psychedelic therapy
- James Fadiman
- David E. Nichols
- Alexander Shulgin
- Owsley Stanley
- List of psychedelic chemists
