= Toshio Hoshino =

Japanese chemist

- Born: 10 October 1899
- Died: 11 February 1979 (aged 79)
- Education: Tohoku Imperial University (now Tohoku University)
- Occupation: Chemist
- Organization: Tokyo Institute of Technology
- Known for: Synthesis of bufotenin and 5-MeO-DMT, other contributions

Toshio Hoshino (10 December 1899 – 11 February 1979) is a Japanese chemist who specialized in natural product and polymer chemistry. He was a professor at the Tokyo Institute of Technology. Among other contributions, Hoshino, along with his colleague Kenya Shimodaira, is notable in being the first to synthesize the psychedelic tryptamines bufotenin (5-HO-DMT) and 5-MeO-DMT (mebufotenin) in 1935 and 1936, respectively. However, the hallucinogenic effects of these compounds and of tryptamines generally did not become known until much later in the 1950s and thereafter.

== See also ==
- List of psychedelic chemists
