= Der Meskalinrausch =

Der Meskalinrausch, seine Geschichte und Erscheinungsweise
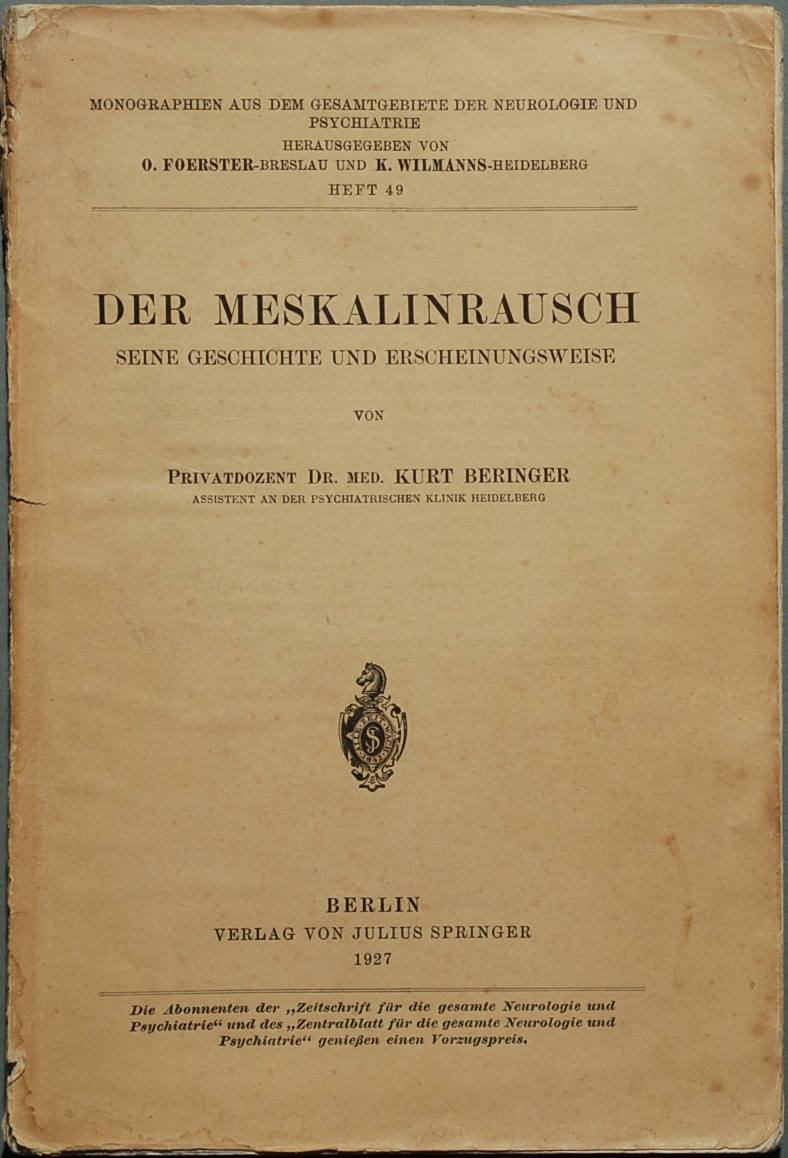
- Author: Kurt Beringer
- Language: German
- Series: Monographien aus dem Gesamtgebiete der Neurologie und Psychiatrie
- Release number: Heft 49
- Subject: Mescaline; Psychedelic drugs
- Genre: Non-fiction
- Publisher: Julius Springer
- Publication date: 1927
- Publication place: Berlin, Germany
- Pages: 315
- ISBN: 978-3-540-04660-8
- OCLC: 2536666
- Dewey Decimal: 615.323471
- LC Class: RC331 .M7 hft. 49
- Website: PDF

Der Meskalinrausch, seine Geschichte und Erscheinungsweise, also known as Mescaline Intoxication, its History and Manifestation, is a German monograph about the psychedelic drug mescaline by German neurologist and psychiatrist Kurt Beringer that was published in 1927.

Mescaline became commercially available in 1920 following its first synthesis in 1919. In 1921, Beringer started clinical studies of mescaline, administered it to more than 60 people, mostly doctors and medical students at his clinic, and studied its psychological effects, especially its visuals. He published his findings in Der Meskalinrausch in 1927.

Beringer, in his monograph and in other publications, was the first to comment on similarities between mescaline intoxication and schizophrenia symptoms, describing the effects of mescaline as "experimental psychosis".

After its publication, Heinrich Klüver used Beringer's data in part to conduct the first phenomenological analysis of psychedelic effects. He published his findings in his own monograph Mescal: The Divine Plant and Its Psychological Effects in 1928.

== See also ==
- List of psychedelic literature
- Mescal: The Divine Plant and Its Psychological Effects (1928)
- Le Peyotl: La Plante Qui Fait les Yeux Émerveillés (1927)
