= Entoptic phenomena (archaeology) =

Aspect of prehistoric art

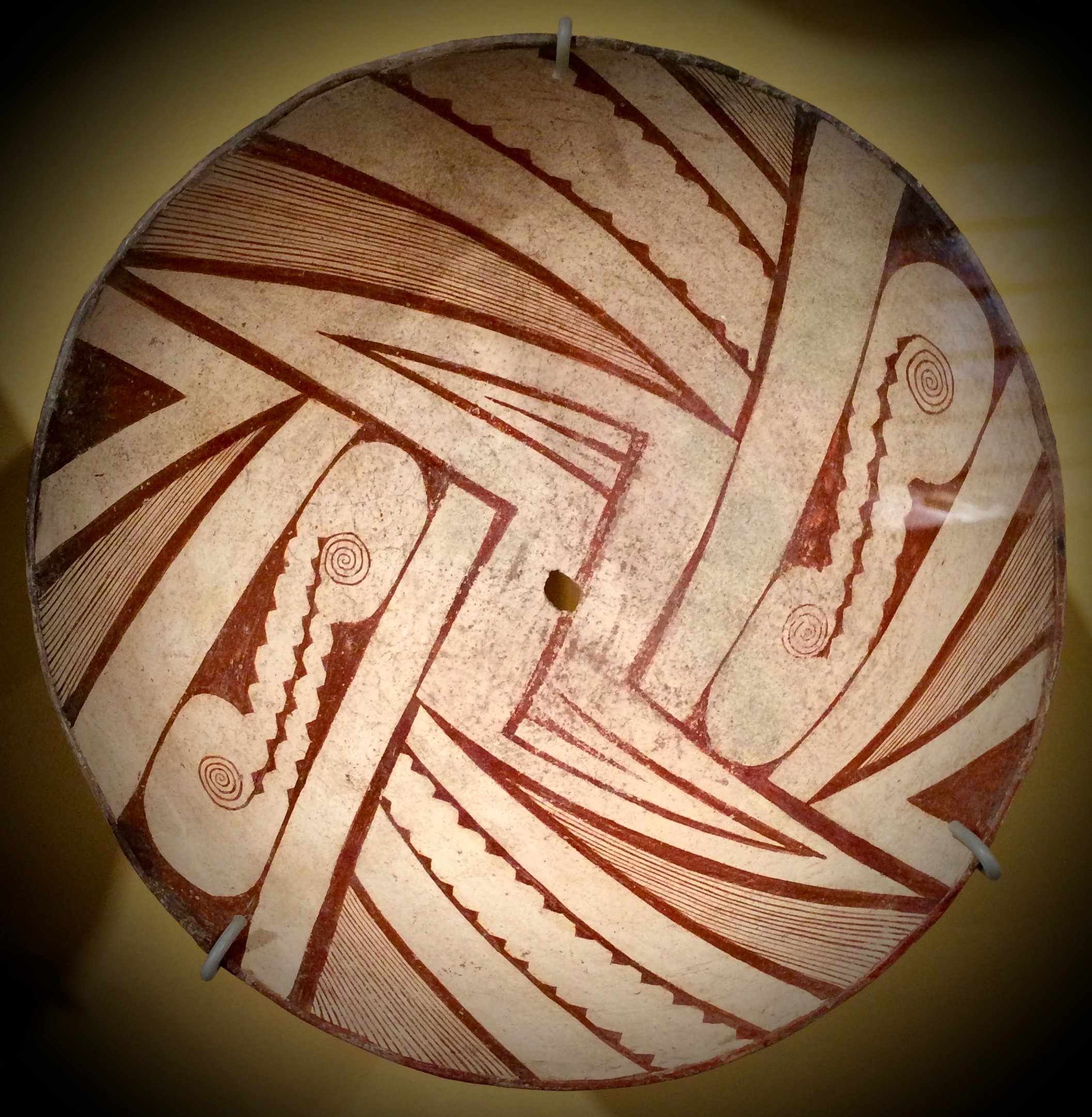
Tony Berlant and coauthors believe that many of the designs on prehistoric Mimbres pottery, such as this one with characteristic zig-zag designs, are entoptic images from ingesting psychoactive Datura plant extracts. The four spirals are interpreted as representing Datura buds.

In archaeology, the term entoptic phenomena relates to visual experiences derived from within the eye or brain (as opposed to externally, as in normal vision). In this respect they differ slightly from the medical definition, which defines entoptic phenomena as only applying to sources within the eye, not the brain. To avoid this confusion, the term subjective visual phenomena is sometimes used. Entoptic was chosen by author David Lewis-Williams due to its origin from Greek meaning "coming from within".

There has been a great deal of work trying to find evidence of motifs and compositions derived from entoptic phenomena in prehistoric art, especially rock art and megalithic art. The justification of this research is that entoptic phenomena normally occur during states of altered consciousness, the practice of which may affect our views of ancient religious and social practice. The importance of looking outside traditional methods of research for interpreting prehistoric cultures is made more so due to the lack of abundant data which makes current cultural studies viable. Lewis-Williams argues that "art and the ability to comprehend it are more dependent on kinds of mental imagery and the ability to manipulate mental images than on intelligence."

== David Lewis-Williams's system ==
=== Stage 1 ===
Experiences include geometric visual patterns such as dots, zagging lines, as well as grid patterns which are all common shapes which are universally understood by the human condition. These patterns and shapes can be seen without aid of psychotropic substances but under their influence the heightened effects precipitate modes of altered consciousness. Entoptic experiences differ from hallucinations in that they are a purely visual phenomenon, while hallucinations represent experience of culturally occurring themes as well as physical coming from the five senses.

=== Stage 2 ===
Entoptic Phenomena are interpreted in ways that can be understood, matched to objects or ideas that may be familiar in day-to-day life and may also be attributed to the individuals state such as hunger, sexual arousal, or anxiety and fear. Placing objects in reality from base shapes seen under influence from psychotropics which link to somatic physical responses lead now to full hallucinations. The relation between the first stage entoptic image and later stage full hallucinations are not mutually exclusive, both may be present.

=== Stage 3 ===
Stage 3 images become iconic, relating to themes from the subjects life and become linked to powerful emotional experiences. Metaphor and simile give way to the belief that objects are exactly what they appear to be "subject losing insight into the differences between literal and analogical meanings" These stages may not always be sequential, and all stages may not be experienced depending on the subject and of course the type of psychotropic being used.

Lewis-Williams notes that altered states and their resulting impact on human consciousness are often marginalized within state, scientific, and religious realms. "The contemporary Western emphasis on the supreme value of intelligence has tended to suppress certain forms of consciousness and to regard them as irrational, marginal, aberrant or even pathological and thereby to eliminate them from investigations of the deep past." As with any well rounded approach to cultural or historical study, all aspects of the human condition must be explored, especially when such exploration takes us outside of our usual cultural perspective.

== See also ==
- Entheogen
- Form constant
- Optical illusions
- Phosphene
- Psychedelic art
