= Heinrich Klüver =

German-American psychologist and philosopher

- Born: May 25, 1897; Province of Schleswig-Holstein
- Died: February 8, 1979 (aged 81); Oak Lawn, Illinois
- Parent(s): Wilhelm Klüver (father); Dorothes (Wübbers) Klüver (mother)
- Scientific career
- Fields: Psychology; Philosophy; Neuroanatomy
- Workplaces: University of Chicago

Signature
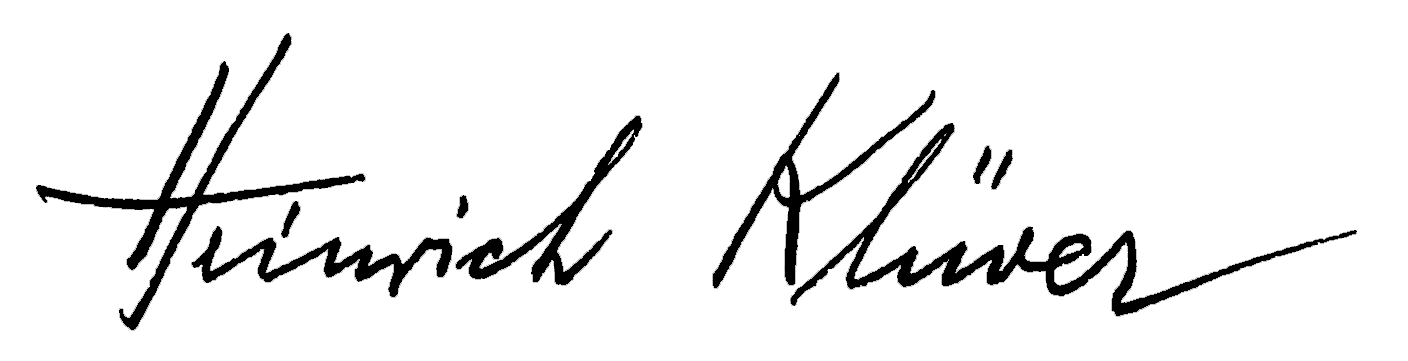

Heinrich Klüver (/ˈkluːvər/; May 25, 1897 – February 8, 1979) was a German-American biological psychologist and philosopher born in Holstein.

After serving in the Imperial German Army during World War I, Klüver studied at both the University of Hamburg and the University of Berlin from 1920 to 1923. In the latter year, he arrived in the United States and earned his Ph.D. in physiological psychology from Stanford University. Then in 1927, he married Cessa Feyerabend and settled in the United States permanently, becoming a naturalized U.S. citizen in 1934. Klüver was a member of the 'core group' of cybernetics pioneers that participated in the Macy Conferences in the 1940s and 1950s. He collaborated most often and fruitfully with Paul Bucy and made various contributions to neuroanatomy, the most notable being Klüver–Bucy syndrome.

Klüver's expositions of and experiments with mescaline were also groundbreaking at the time. In the 1920s, he coined the term "cobweb figure" to describe one of the four form constant geometric visual hallucinations experienced in the early stage of a mescaline trip. He described this experience as, "colored threads running together in a revolving center, the whole similar to a cobweb". Other forms of geometric visual hallucinations include the chessboard design, tunnel, and spiral. Klüver wrote that "many 'atypical' visions are upon close inspection nothing but variations of these form-constants."

Klüver was an elected member of the American Academy of Arts and Sciences, the United States National Academy of Sciences, and the American Philosophical Society.

== Klüver-Bucy Syndrome ==
Klüver's temporal lobe ablation experiments were inspired by his previous work using mescaline injections on macaque monkeys. Klüver was particularly interested in using the psychedelic to understand visual hallucinations. He stated that this drug was useful for understanding the basis of normal visual perception, color-blindness, and even strange perceptual phenomena like synesthesia.

When monkeys were injected with mescaline, Klüver noted that they exhibited strange chewing and licking movements, as well as convulsions. He related his observations to the temporal seizures that were described by John Hughlings Jackson and suspected that mescaline might also act on the temporal lobe. With the help of Paul Bucy, Klüver began resecting the trigeminal nerves and eventually, substantial parts of the temporal lobe of a once aggressive monkey. Following this experimental procedure, both researchers found that the monkey became tame.

These symptoms were labeled as Klüver-Bucy syndrome and were presented at the American Physiological Society Meeting in 1937. Klüver-Bucy syndrome was divided into six categories: psychic blindness, hypermetamorphosis, dietary changes, oral tendencies, emotional changes, and an increase in sexual behaviors.

Psychic blindness refers to the inability to detect or recognize objects in the absence of visual impairment; this condition is now known as visual agnosia. Furthermore, hypermetamorphosis refers to the impulsive behavior of reacting to all stimuli (through touching and looking). Strangely, monkeys began eating large quantities of meat and exhibited the same oral tendencies seen after being injected with mescaline. The resections also led to reduced social behaviors, tame temperaments, and an increase in masturbation.

== Contributions to Histology ==
During the final phase of his scientific career, Klüver investigated the brain tissue of different animals. Through this research, he discovered that white matter contains a large amount of the chemical porphyrin and wanted to develop a staining technique that would differentiate the white matter from the grey matter. Through a series of experiments, Klüver found that Luxol fast blue MBS highlighted this difference perfectly and could be used in combination with Nissl stains. Even today, Luxol fast blue MBS continues to be used.

== Selected publications ==
- An Experimental Study of the Eidetic Type. Worcester, Mass.: Genetic Psychology Monographs, vol. 1, no. 2 (1926); New York: Arno Press (1975).
- Mescal: The 'Divine' Plant And Its Psychological Effects. London: Kegan Paul, Trench, Trubner & Co. (1928). Introduction by Macdonald Critchley.
- Mechanism of Hallucinations In: Studies in Personality, by Q. McNemar and M. A. Merrill (1942).
- Behavior Mechanisms in Monkeys. Chicago: Phoenix Books (1966). Introduction by Karl Spencer Lashley.
- Mescal, and Mechanism of Hallucinations. Chicago: Phoenix Books (1966).

== See also ==
- Klüver–Bucy syndrome
- Mescal: The 'Divine' Plant and Its Psychological Effects (1928)
- Form constant
- Der Meskalinrausch
