= Le Peyotl: La Plante Qui Fait les Yeux Émerveillés =

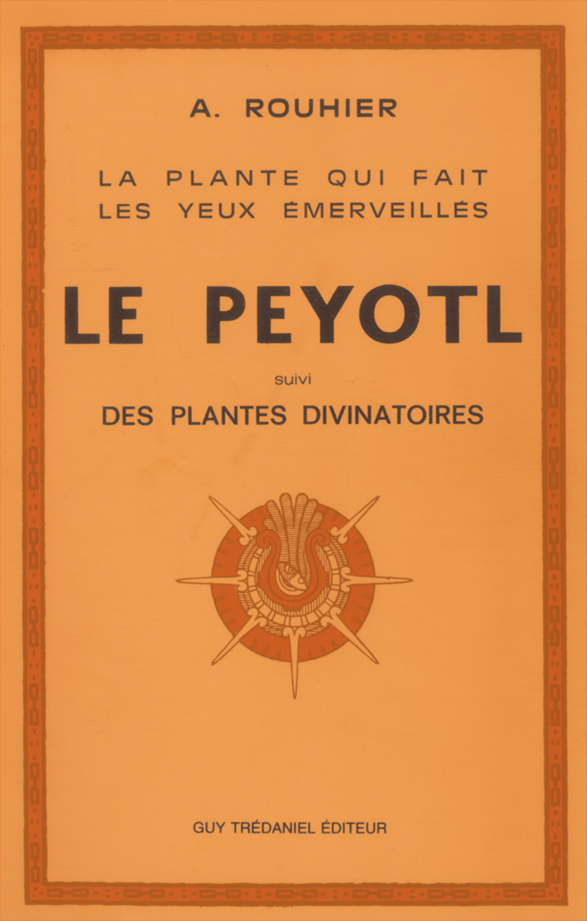
- Author: Alexandre Rouhier
- Language: French
- Subject: Peyote
- Genre: Non-fiction
- Publisher: Gaston Doin et Cie
- Publication date: 1927
- Publication place: Paris, France
- Pages: 372
- Website: archive.org/details/alexandre-rouhier-peyotl/

Le Peyotl: La Plante Qui Fait les Yeux Émerveillés, also known as Peyote: The Plant That Fills the Eyes with Marvels, is a 1927 book about peyote by the French pharmacist Alexandre Rouhier. Peyote contains the psychedelic drug mescaline.

The book extensively reviews peyote, including its botany, chemistry, history, ethnography, and medical properties. In addition, it included original research by Rouhier on peyote and its alkaloids. It is said to have introduced France and Europe to mescaline in various ways.

The book followed and was largely based on Rouhier's 1926 dissertation, Monographie du Peyotl: Echinocactus Williamsii Lem. (Peyote Monograph: Echinocactus Williamsii Lem.). It was reprinted in 1975 with minor corrections. Rouhier also published other articles on peyote. In addition, besides peyote, he published works on other drugs such as yagé and yoco (caffeine).

Several reviews of the book have been published. It was described as the most comprehensive review of the drug that has been published up to that date. Alexander Shulgin read the book along with other works prior to eventually trying mescaline himself in 1960.

Rouhier grew and sold peyote from his pharmacy in France from 1927 until the 1960s. No prescription was required and advertisements appeared in the popular press.

== See also ==
- List of psychedelic literature
- Mescaline § History
- Psychedelic drug § The phenethylamine psychedelic mescaline
- Der Meskalinrausch (Mescaline Intoxication) (1927)
- Mescal: The 'Divine' Plant and Its Psychological Effects (1928)
