= Mescal: The 'Divine' Plant and Its Psychological Effects =

1928 book by Heinrich Klüver

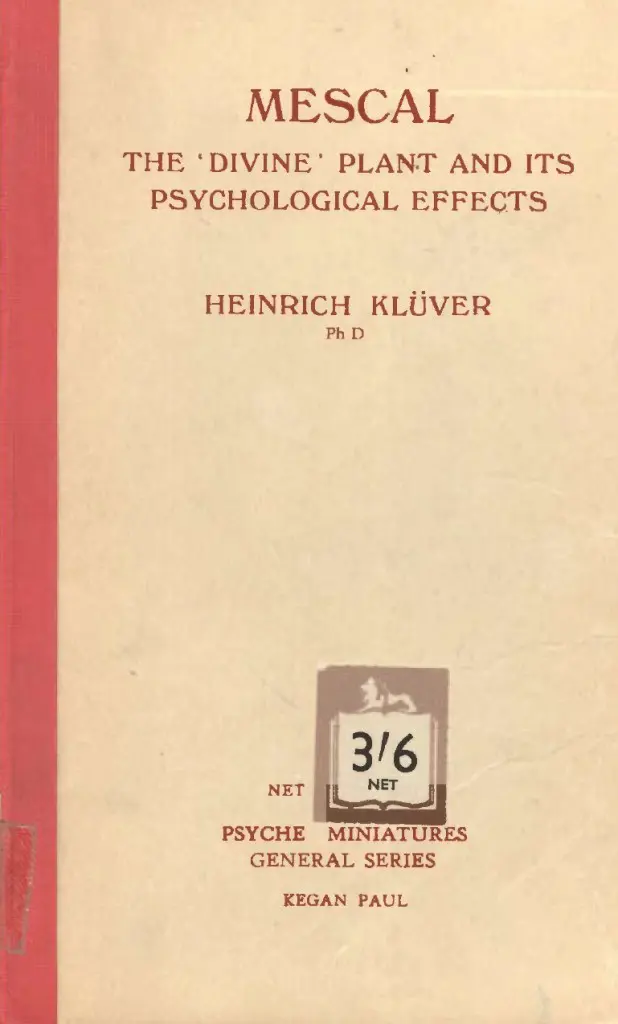
- Author: Heinrich Klüver
- Language: English
- Series: Psyche Miniatures
- Release number: General Series No. 22
- Subject: Peyote
- Genre: Non-fiction
- Publisher: Kegan Paul, Trench, Trubner & Co.
- Publication date: 1928
- Publication place: London, United Kingdom
- Pages: 105
- OCLC: 1904709
- Dewey Decimal: 615.323471
- LC Class: RM666.M38 KLU
- Website: PDF (1928); PDF (1966)

Mescal: The 'Divine' Plant and Its Psychological Effects is a 1928 book about the peyote and its effects by the German–American physiological psychologist and philosopher Heinrich Klüver. Peyote contains the psychedelic drug mescaline.

Klüver studied the subjective and perceptual effects of peyote at the University of Chicago by administering it to several subjects and to himself. His research described in the book includes the first phenomenological description of the psychedelic experience as well as the systematic analysis of hallucinogen-induced geometrical images. He worked with peyote rather than Merck's mescaline (available since 1920) as the former was easier to source. Klüver found that peyote produced recurring geometric patterns with remarkable uniformity across individuals. He referred to these patterns as "form constants" and categorized them into four groups, including lattices, cobwebs, tunnels, and spirals. Form constants were Klüver's most enduring contribution to cognitive psychology. Besides these visual phenomena, Klüver also described other types of visual effects, such as brightened colors, increased contrast, and perceptions of movement or motion, as well as synaesthesia. In addition, he described emotional and psychological effects of peyote, for instance its noetic qualities. Klüver's work built on the observations of earlier researchers like Silas Weir Mitchell and Havelock Ellis.

Mescal: The 'Divine' Plant and Its Psychological Effects was the first book or scientific monograph on peyote or mescaline to be published in English. It reviewed the existing literature and introduced the English-speaking world to the German research on the drug. Richard Evans Schultes was inspired to study psychoactive plants by the book, which he had obtained from the Harvard Botanical Museum and read. Other researchers have expanded on Klüver's work, for instance Ronald Siegel extending his form constants from four types to nine.

Klüver later published a book chapter called Mechanisms of Hallucinations in 1942. He then combined both Mescal: The 'Divine' Plant and Its Psychological Effects (1928) and Mechanisms of Hallucinations (1942) into a single title known as Mescal and Mechanisms of Hallucinations and published this in 1966. This combined and reprinted version had a psychedelic-themed jacket and greatly outsold the original 1928 monograph. One other relevant publication is Klüver's 1926 journal article Mescal Visions and Eidetic Vision. This article attracted the attention of Charles Kay Ogden and MacDonald Critchley and led to Klüver's 1928 book being written.

== See also ==
- List of psychedelic literature
- Form constant
- Mescaline § History
- Psychedelic drug § The phenethylamine psychedelic mescaline
- Der Meskalinrausch (Mescaline Intoxication) (1927)
- Le Peyotl: La Plante Qui Fait les Yeux Émerveillés (1927)
