= Form constant =

Recurringly observed geometric pattern

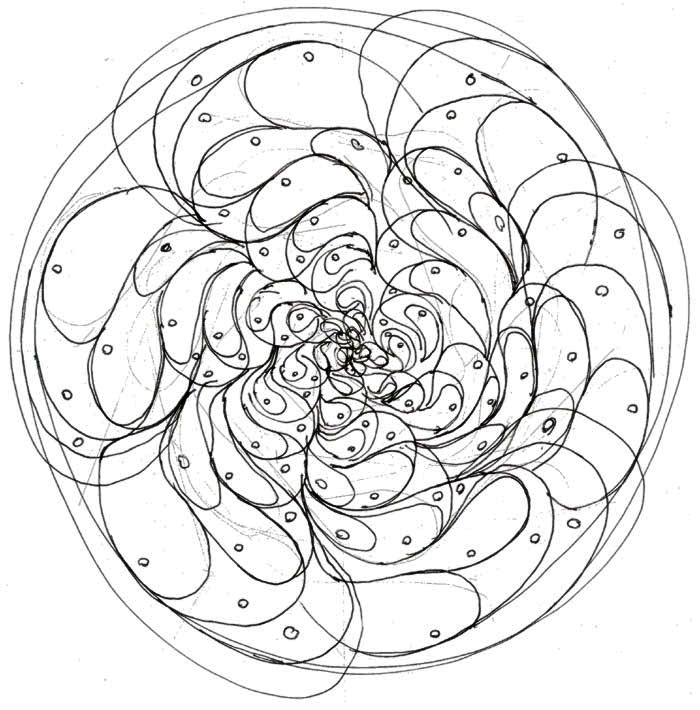
An example of a form constant

A form constant is one of several geometric patterns which are recurringly observed during hypnagogia, hallucinations and altered states of consciousness.

== History ==
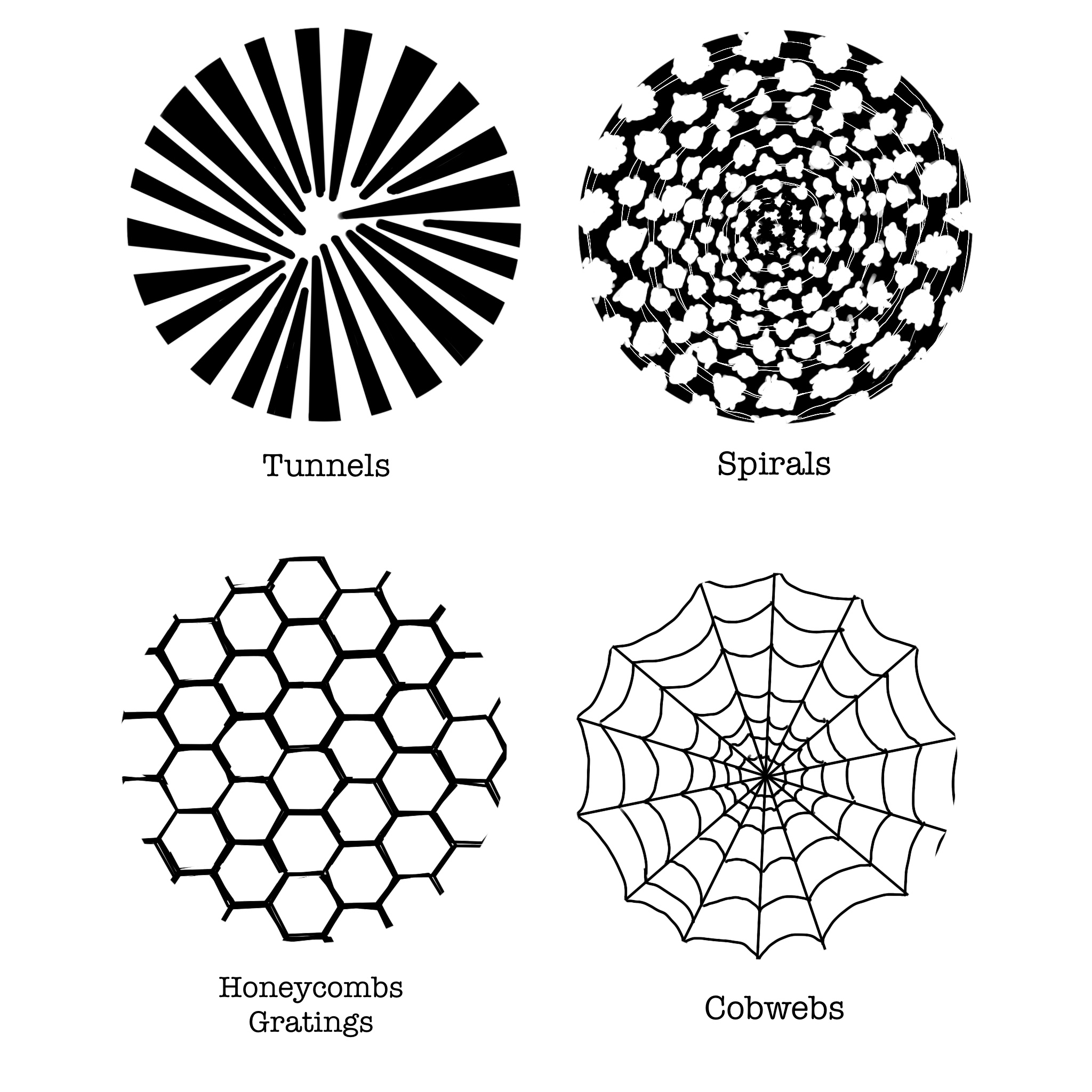
Klüver's four form constants

In 1926, Heinrich Klüver systematically studied the effects of mescaline (peyote) on the subjective experiences of its users. In addition to producing hallucinations characterized by bright, "highly saturated" colors and vivid imagery, Klüver noticed that mescaline produced recurring geometric patterns in different users. He called these patterns "form constants" and categorized four types: lattices (including honeycombs, checkerboards, and triangles), cobwebs, tunnels, and spirals.

In 1988 David Lewis-Williams and T.A. Dowson incorporated the form constant into his Three Stages of Trance model, the geometric shapes comprising the visuals observed in the model's first stage.

== Precipitants ==
Klüver's form constants have appeared in other drug-induced and naturally occurring hallucinations, suggesting a similar physiological process underlying hallucinations with different triggers. Klüver's form constants also appear in near-death experiences and sensory experiences of those with synesthesia. Other triggers include psychological stress, threshold consciousness (hypnagogia), insulin hypoglycemia, the delirium of fever, epilepsy, psychotic episodes, advanced syphilis, sensory deprivation, photostimulation, electrical stimulation, crystal gazing, migraine headaches, dizziness and a variety of drug-induced intoxications. These shapes may appear on their own or with eyes shut in the form of phosphenes, especially when exerting pressure against the closed eyelid.

It is believed that the reason why these form constants appear has to do with the way the visual system is organized, and in particular in the mapping between patterns on the retina and the columnar organization of the primary visual cortex. Concentric circles in the retina are mapped into parallel lines in the visual cortex. Spirals, tunnels, lattices and cobwebs map into lines in different directions. This means that if activation spreads in straight lines within the visual cortex, the experience is equivalent to looking at actual form constants.

Author Michael Moorcock once observed in print that the shapes he had seen during his migraine headaches resembled exactly the form of fractals. The diversity of conditions that provoke such patterns suggests that form constants reflect some fundamental property of visual perception.

== Cultural significance ==
Form constants have a relationship to some forms of abstract art, especially the visual music tradition, as William Wees noted in his book Light Moving in Time about research done by German psychologist Heinrich Klüver on the form constants resulting from mescaline intoxication. The visual and synaesthetic hallucinations this drug produced resembles, as Wees noted, a listing of visual forms employed in visual music:

[Klüver's] analysis of hallucinatory phenomena appearing chiefly during the first stages of mescaline intoxication yielded the following form constants: [emphasis original] (a) grating, lattice, fretwork, filigree, honeycomb, or chessboard; (b) cobweb; (c) tunnel, funnel, alley, cone or vessel; (d) spiral. Many phenomena are, on close examination, nothing but modifications and transformations of these basic forms. The tendency towards "geometrization," as expressed in these form constants, is also apparent in the following two ways: (a) the forms are frequently repeated, combined, or elaborated into ornamental designs and mosaics of various kinds; (b) the elements constituting these forms, such as squares in the chessboard design, often have boundaries consisting of geometric forms.

These form-constants provide links between abstraction, visual music and synaesthesia. The cultural significance of form constants, as Wees notes in Light Moving in Time is part of the history of abstract film and video.

The practice of the ancient art of divination may suggest a deliberate practice of cultivating form constant imagery and using intuition and/or imagination to derive some meaning from transient visual phenomena.

Psychedelic art, inspired at least in part by experiences with psychedelic substances, frequently includes repetitive abstract forms and patterns such as tessellation, Moiré patterns or patterns similar to those created by paper marbling, and, in later years, fractals. The op art genre of visual art created art using bold imagery very like that of form constants.

In electroacoustic music, Jon Weinel has explored the use of altered states of consciousness as a basis for the design of musical compositions. His work bases the design of sonic materials on typical features of hallucinatory states, and organises them according to hallucinatory narratives. As part of this work, form constants feature prominently as a basis for the design of psychedelic sonic and visual material.

== See also ==
- Biosemiotics
- Closed-eye hallucination – Class of hallucination
- Entoptic phenomenon – Visual effect whose source is within the eye itself
- Hypnagogia – State of consciousness leading into sleep
- Kaleidoscope – Optical instrument to view patterns due to repeated reflection
- Mandala – Spiritual and ritual symbol in Hinduism, Jainism and Buddhism
- Mescal: The 'Divine' Plant and Its Psychological Effects (1928)
- Paisley (design) – Textile design with a teardrop motif
- Pattern recognition – Automated recognition of patterns and regularities in data
- Psychophysics – Branch of knowledge relating physical stimuli and psychological perception
- Qualia – Instances of subjective experience
- Religion and drugs – Attitude towards the use of drugs in several religions
- Visual cortex – Region of the brain that processes visual information
- Visual snow – Visual impairment
- Visual system – Body parts responsible for vision
- Uniform tilings in hyperbolic plane – Symmetric subdivision in hyperbolic geometry

== Sources ==
- Blackmore, Susan. Dying to Live: Near-Death Experiences. Buffalo, NY: Prometheus Books, 1993.
- Cytowic, Richard E., The Man Who Tasted Shapes.
- Ermentrout, G.B. and Cowan, J.D., "A mathematical theory of visual hallucination patterns." Biol. Cybernet. 34 (1979), no. 3, 137–150.
