= Henry Wassén =

Swedish social anthropologist

- Born: 24 August 1908; Gothenburg, Sweden
- Died: 1996 (aged 87–88); Gothenburg, Sweden
- Occupations: Anthropologist, Museum head

Henry Wassén (24 August 1908 – 1996) was a Swedish social anthropologist and museum head.

== Life ==
Wassén was born in Gothenburg, the son of a merchant. He graduated with a Studentexamen 1928 and a licentiate degree in Göteborg 1936. He started his career as a teaching assistant at Gothenburg ethnografic museum 1930 and became a curator at the museum in 1954. He was head of the museum between 1968–73 and was awarded the honorary title of Professor in 1972.

Wassén made several scientific expeditions to Colombia, Panama and Central America.

Alongside his work at the museum he had a number of voluntary obligations such as board member at Sveriges museimannaförening, chairman of their Gothenburg faction and board member at The Maritime Museum, Gothenburg. He was a corresponding member of the Colombian Academy of Exact, Physical and Natural Sciences and a member of various scientific societies in Argentina, Brazil, Colombia, Guatemala, Panama, Peru and Mexico.

From his scientific work he published many books, some in a popular science style. Wassén died in his hometown of Göteborg in 1996.

== Selected publications ==
- Odhners historia : illustrerad krönika över en maskin att räkna med : ett apropå till 100-årsminnet av W.T Odhners födelse 1845, 1945
- Mexikos, Central- och Sydamerikas arkeologi, published by Gothenburg ethnographic museum, 1963
- Some words on the Cuna Indians and especially their "mola"-garments, 1964
- The use of some specific kinds of South American Indian snuff and related paraphernalia, with appendix: Einige Bemerkungen zur Anwendung und Wirkungsweise des Epena-Schnupfpulvers der Waika-Indianer av Georg J. Seitz, 1965
- Four Swedish anthropologists in Argentina in the first decades of the 20th century: biobibliographical notes, 1967
- Mola: Cuna-indiansk textilkonst : Göteborgs etnografiska museum utställer i Röhsska konstslöjdsmuseet: 6 september-oktober 1968, 1968
- A medicine-man's implements and plants in a Tiahuanacoid tomb in Highland Bolivia, co-author Wolmar E. Bondeson ..., 1972
