= Deep water cycle =

Movement of water in the deep Earth

The deep water cycle, or geologic water cycle, involves exchange of water with the mantle, with water carried down by subducting oceanic plates and returning through volcanic activity, distinct from the water cycle process that occurs above and on the surface of Earth. Some of the water makes it all the way to the lower mantle and may even reach the outer core. Mineral physics experiments show that hydrous minerals can carry water deep into the mantle in colder slabs and even "nominally anhydrous minerals" can store several oceans' worth of water.

The process of deep water recycling involves water entering the mantle by being carried down by subducting oceanic plates (a process known as regassing) being balanced by water being released at mid-ocean ridges (degassing). This is a central concept in the understanding of the long‐term exchange of water between the Earth's interior and the exosphere and the transport of water bound in hydrous minerals.

== Introduction ==
In the conventional view of the water cycle (also known as the hydrologic cycle), water moves between reservoirs in the atmosphere and Earth's surface or near-surface (including the ocean, rivers and lakes, glaciers and polar ice caps, the biosphere and groundwater). However, in addition to the surface cycle, water also plays an important role in geological processes reaching down into the crust and mantle. Water content in magma determines how explosive a volcanic eruption is; hot water is the main conduit for economically important minerals to concentrate in hydrothermal mineral deposits; and water plays an important role in the formation and migration of petroleum.

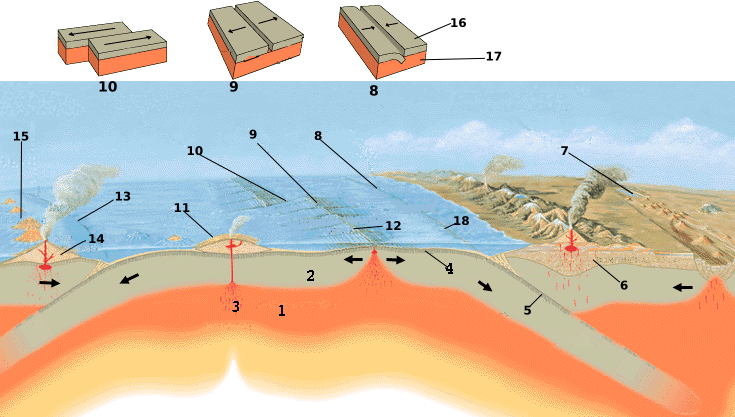
Schematic of tectonic plate boundaries. Discussed in the text are a subducting plate (5); an island arc (15) overlying a mantle wedge; a mid-ocean ridge (12); and a hotspot (3).

Water is not just present as a separate phase in the ground. Seawater percolates into oceanic crust and hydrates igneous rocks such as olivine and pyroxene, transforming them into hydrous minerals such as serpentines, talc and brucite. In this form, water is carried down into the mantle. In the upper mantle, heat and pressure dehydrates these minerals, releasing much of it to the overlying mantle wedge, triggering the melting of rock that rises to form volcanic arcs. However, some of the "nominally anhydrous minerals" that are stable deeper in the mantle can store small concentrations of water in the form of hydroxyl (OH^{−}), and because they occupy large volumes of the Earth, they are capable of storing at least as much as the world's oceans.

The conventional view of the ocean's origin is that it was filled by outgassing from the mantle in the early Archean and the mantle has remained dehydrated ever since. However, subduction carries water down at a rate that would empty the ocean in 1–2 billion years. Despite this, changes in the global sea level over the past 3–4 billion years have only been a few hundred metres, much smaller than the average ocean depth of 4 kilometres. Thus, the fluxes of water into and out of the mantle are expected to be roughly balanced, and the water content of the mantle steady. Water carried into the mantle eventually returns to the surface in eruptions at mid-ocean ridges and hotspots. This circulation of water into the mantle and back is known as the deep water cycle or the geologic water cycle.

Estimates of the amount of water in the mantle range from 1/4 to 4 times the water in the ocean. There are 1.37×10^{18} m^{3} of water in the seas, therefore, this would suggest that there is between 3.4×10^{17} and 5.5×10^{18} m^{3} of water in the mantle. Constraints on water in the mantle come from mantle mineralogy, samples of rock from the mantle, and geophysical probes.

== Storage capacity ==
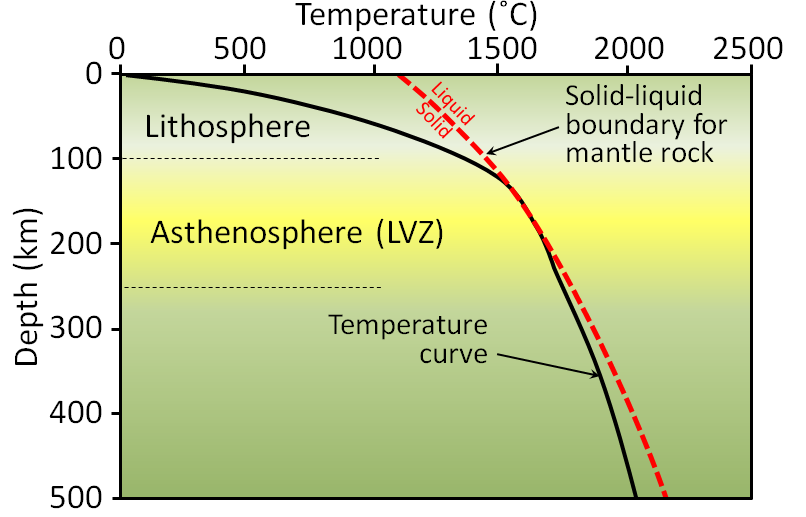
Dependence of temperature on depth in Earth's upper 500 kilometers (black curve).

An upper bound on the amount of water in the mantle can be obtained by considering the amount of water that can be carried by its minerals (their storage capacity). This depends on temperature and pressure. There is a steep temperature gradient in the lithosphere where heat travels by conduction, but in the mantle the rock is stirred by convection and the temperature increases more slowly (see figure). Descending slabs have colder than average temperatures.

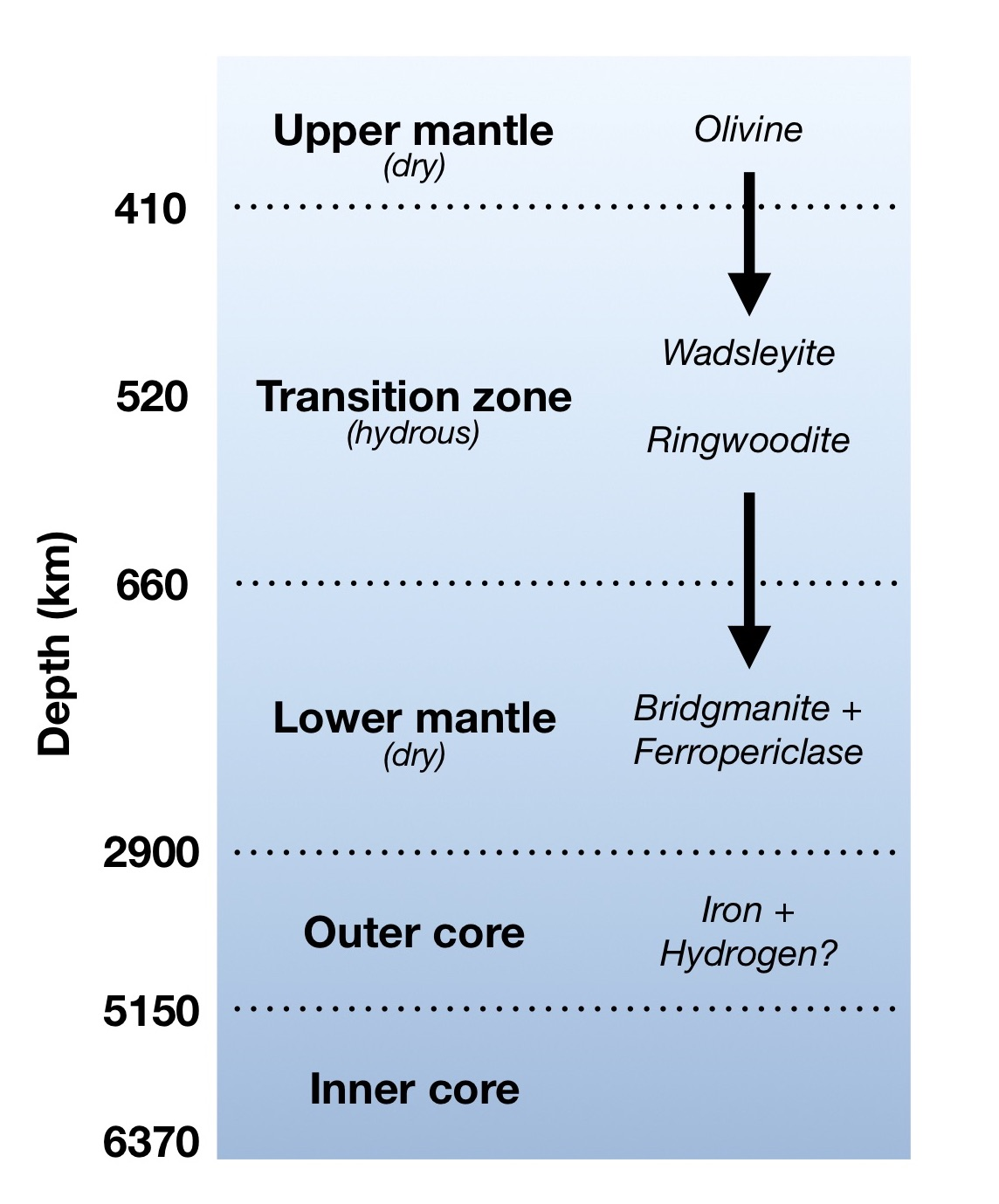
Phase transformations of olivine moving through the upper mantle, transition zone, and lower mantle. In the core, water might be stored as hydrogen bound to iron.

The mantle can be divided into the upper mantle (above 410 km depth), transition zone (between 410 km and 660 km), and the lower mantle (below 660 km). Much of the mantle consists of olivine and its high-pressure polymorphs. At the top of the transition zone, it undergoes a phase transition to wadsleyite, and at about 520 km depth, wadsleyite transforms into ringwoodite, which has the spinel structure. At the top of the lower mantle, ringwoodite decomposes into bridgmanite and ferropericlase.

The most common mineral in the upper mantle is olivine. For a depth of 410 km, an early estimate of 0.13 percentage of water by weight (wt%) was revised upwards to 0.4 wt% and then to 1 wt%. However, the carrying capacity decreases dramatically towards the top of the mantle. Another common mineral, pyroxene, also has an estimated capacity of 1 wt% near 410 km.

In the transition zone, water is carried by wadsleyite and ringwoodite; in the relatively cold conditions of a descending slab, they can carry up to 3 wt%, while in the warmer temperatures of the surrounding mantle their storage capacity is about 0.5 wt%. The transition zone is also composed of at least 40% majorite, a high pressure phase of garnet; this only has capacity of 0.1 wt% or less.

The storage capacity of the lower mantle is a subject of controversy, with estimates ranging from the equivalent of three times to less than 3% of the ocean. Experiments have been limited to pressures found in the top 100 km of the mantle and are challenging to perform. Results may be biased upwards by hydrous mineral inclusions and downwards by a failure to maintain fluid saturation. At high pressures, water can interact with pure iron to get FeH and FeO. Models of the outer core predict that it could hold as much as 100 oceans of water in this form, and this reaction may have dried out the lower mantle in the early history of Earth.

== Water from the mantle ==
The carrying capacity of the mantle is only an upper bound, and there is no compelling reason to suppose that the mantle is saturated. Further constraints on the quantity and distribution of water in the mantle comes from a geochemical analysis of erupted basalts and xenoliths from the mantle.

=== Basalts ===
Basalts formed at mid-ocean ridges and hotspots originate in the mantle and are used to provide information on the composition of the mantle. Magma rising to the surface may undergo fractional crystallization in which components with higher melting points settle out first, and the resulting melts can have widely varying water contents; but when little separation has occurred, the water content is between about 0.07–0.6 wt%. (By comparison, basalts in back-arc basins around volcanic arcs have between 1 wt% and 2.9 wt% because of the water coming off the subducting plate.)

Mid-ocean ridge basalts (MORBs) are commonly classified by the abundance of trace elements that are incompatible with the minerals they inhabit. They are divided into "normal" MORB or N-MORB, with relatively low abundances of these elements, and enriched E-MORB. The enrichment of water correlates well with that of these elements. In N-MORB, the water content of the source mantle is inferred to be 0.08–0.18 wt%, while in E-MORB it is 0.2–0.95 wt%.

Another common classification, based on analyses of MORBs and ocean island basalts (OIBs) from hotspots, identifies five components. Focal zone (FOZO) basalt is considered to be closest to the original composition of the mantle. Two enriched end-members (EM-1 and EM-2) are thought to arise from recycling of ocean sediments and OIBs. HIMU stands for "high-μ", where μ is a ratio of uranium and lead isotopes (μ = ^{238}U/^{204}Pb). The fifth component is depleted MORB (DMM). Because the behavior of water is very similar to that of the element cesium, ratios of water to cesium are often used to estimate the concentration of water in regions that are sources for the components. Multiple studies put the water content of FOZO at around 0.075 wt%, and much of this water is likely "juvenile" water acquired during the accretion of Earth. DMM has only 60 ppm water. If these sources sample all the regions of the mantle, the total water depends on their proportion; including uncertainties, estimates range from 0.2 to 2.3 oceans.

=== Diamond inclusions ===
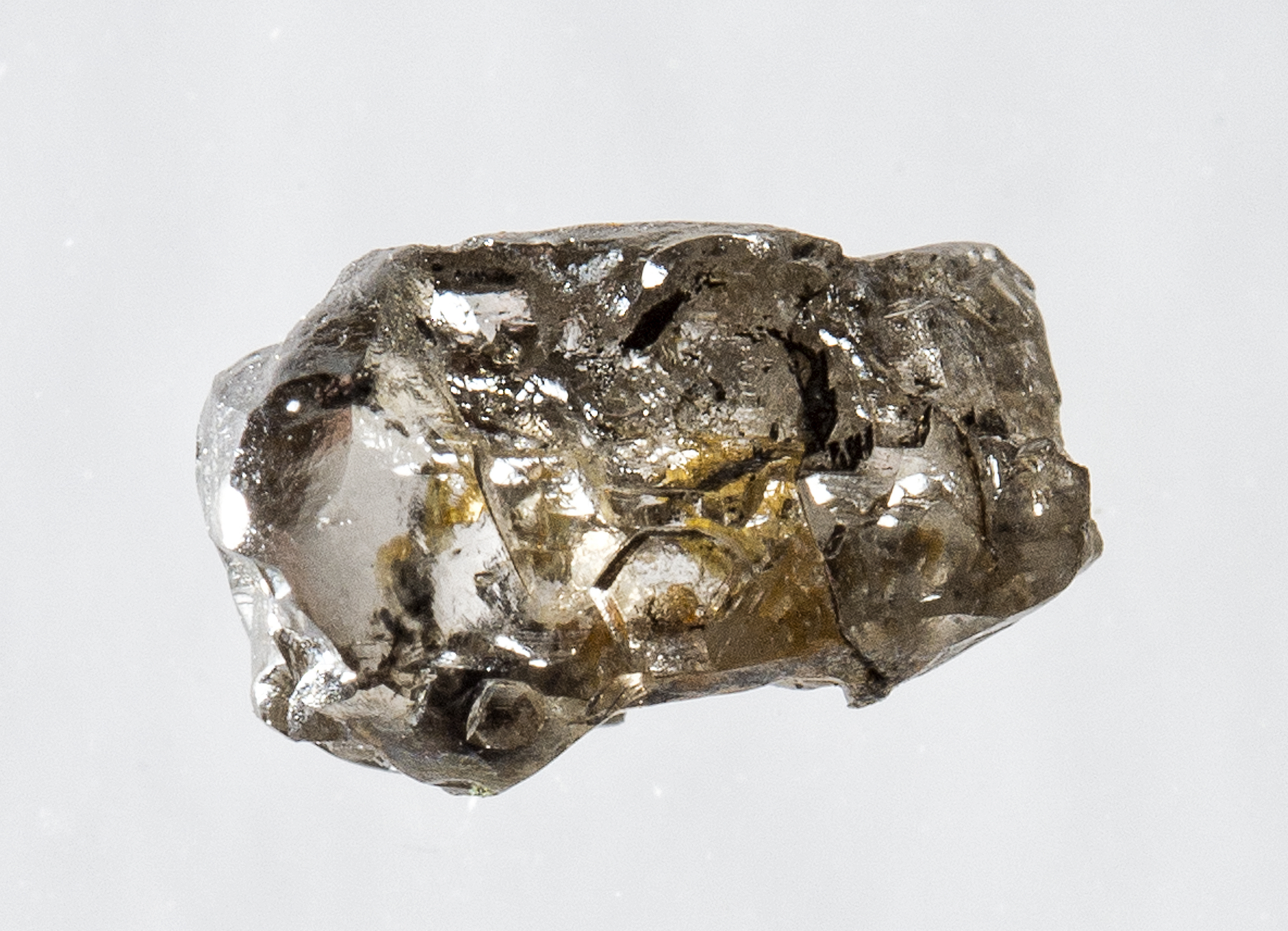
Diamond from Juína, Brazil with ringwoodite inclusions suggests presence of water in the transition zone.

Mineral samples from the transition zone and lower mantle come from inclusions found in diamonds. Researchers have recently discovered diamond inclusions of ice-VII in the transition zone. Ice-VII is water in a high pressure state. The presence of diamonds that formed in the transition zone and contain ice-VII inclusions suggests that water is present in the transition zone and at the top of the lower mantle. Of the thirteen ice-VII instances found, eight have pressures around 8–12 GPa, tracing the formation of inclusions to 400–550 km. Two inclusions have pressures between 24 and 25 GPa, indicating the formation of inclusions at 610–800 km. The pressures of the ice-VII inclusions provide evidence that water must have been present at the time the diamonds formed in the transition zone in order to have become trapped as inclusions. Researchers also suggest that the range of pressures at which inclusions formed implies inclusions existed as fluids rather than solids.

Another diamond was found with ringwoodite inclusions. Using techniques including infrared spectroscopy, Raman spectroscopy, and x-ray diffraction, scientists found that the water content of the ringwoodite was 1.4 wt% and inferred that the bulk water content of the mantle is about 1 wt%.

== Geophysical evidence ==
=== Seismic ===
Both sudden decreases in seismic activity and electricity conduction indicate that the transition zone is able to produce hydrated ringwoodite. The USArray seismic experiment is a long-term project using seismometers to chart the mantle underlying the United States. Using data from this project, seismometer measurements show corresponding evidence of melt at the bottom of the transition zone. Melt in the transition zone can be visualized through seismic velocity measurements as sharp velocity decreases at the lower mantle caused by the subduction of slabs through the transition zone. The measured decrease in seismic velocities correlates accurately with the predicted presence of 1 weight % melt of H_{2}O.

Ultra low velocity zones (ULVZs) have been discovered right above the core-mantle boundary (CMB). Experiments highlighting the presence of iron peroxide containing hydrogen (FeO_{2}H_{x}) aligns with expectations of the ULVZs. Researchers believe that iron and water could react to form FeO_{2}H_{x} in these ULVZs at the CMB. This reaction would be possible with the interaction of the subduction of minerals containing water and the extensive supply of iron in the Earth's outer core. Past research has suggested the presence of partial melting in ULVZs, but the formation of melt in the area surrounding the CMB remains contested.

== Subduction ==
As an oceanic plate descends into the upper mantle, its minerals tend to lose water. How much water is lost and when depends on the pressure, temperature and mineralogy. Water is carried by a variety of minerals that combine various proportions of magnesium oxide (MgO), silicon dioxide (SiO_{2}), and water. At low pressures (below 5 GPa), these include antigorite, a form of serpentine, and clinochlore (both carrying 13 wt% water); talc (4.8 wt%) and some other minerals with a lower capacity. At moderate pressure (5–7 GPa) the minerals include phlogopite (4.8 wt%), the 10Å phase (a high pressure product of talc and water, 10–13 wt%) and lawsonite (11.5 wt%). At pressures above 7 GPa, there is topaz-OH (Al_{2}SiO_{4}(OH)_{2}, 10 wt%), phase Egg (AlSiO_{3}(OH), 11–18 wt%) and a collection of dense hydrous magnesium silicate (DHMS) or "alphabet" phases such as phase A (12 wt%), D (10 wt%) and E (11 wt%).

The fate of the water depends on whether these phases can maintain an unbroken series as the slab descends. At a depth of about 180 km, where the pressure is about 6 gigapascals (GPa) and the temperature around 600 °C, there is a possible "choke point" where the stability regions just meet. Hotter slabs will lose all their water while cooler slabs pass the water on to the DHMS phases. In cooler slabs, some of the released water may also be stable as Ice VII.

An imbalance in deep water recycling has been proposed as one mechanism that can affect global sea levels.

== See also ==
- Hydrous components in nominally anhydrous minerals
- Hydrous minerals of a subducting slab
