= Christophe Wiart =

French scientist (born 1967)

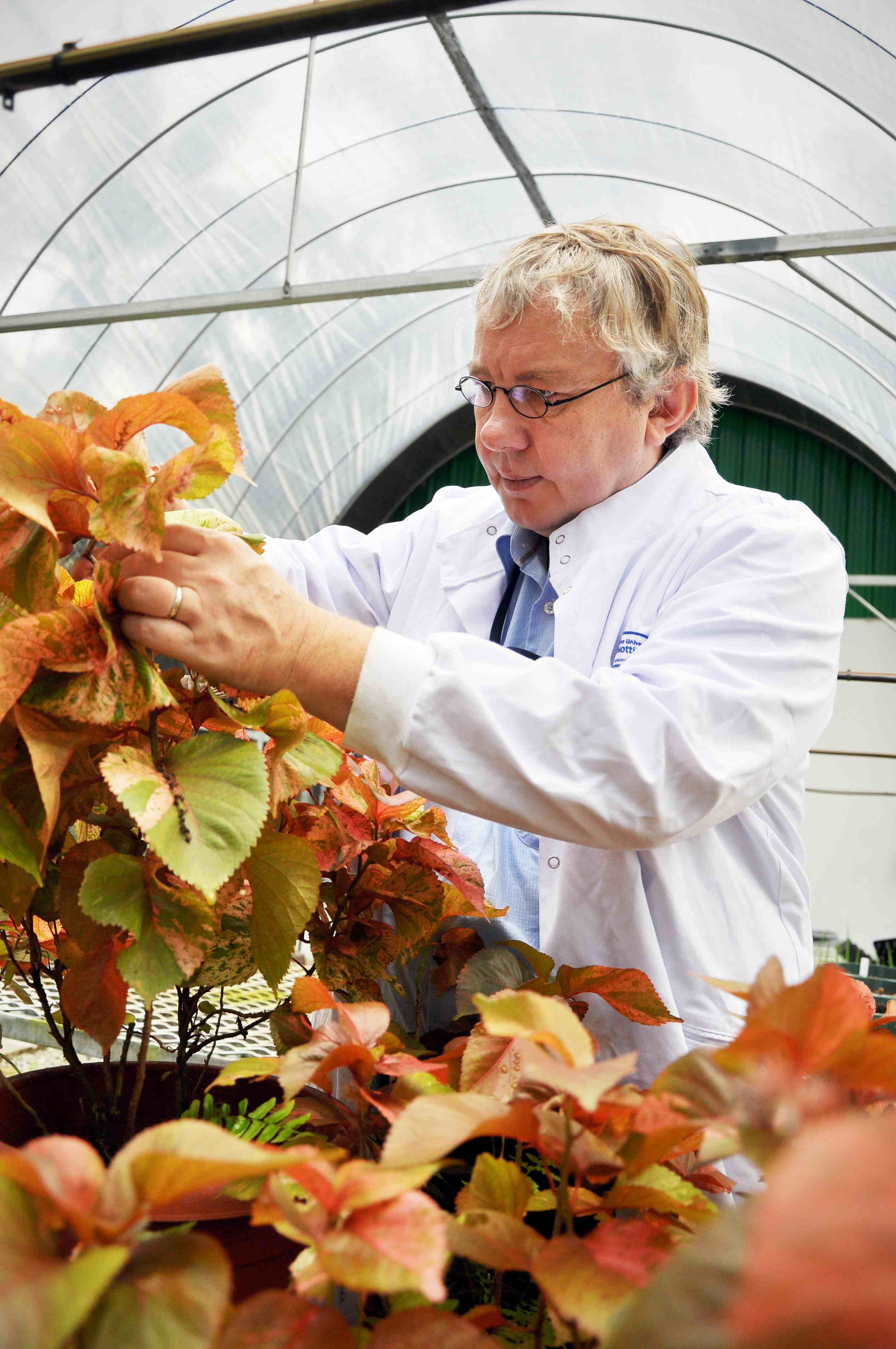
- Born: August 12, 1967 (age 58)
- Known for: Drug discovery from medicinal and rainforest plants
- Scientific career
- Institutions: Associate Professor, School of Pharmacy, The University of Nottingham (Malaysia Campus)

Christophe Wiart (born August 12, 1967) is a French scientist.

His fields of expertise are Asian ethnopharmacology, chemotaxonomy and ethnobotany. He has collected, identified and classified several hundred species of medicinal plants of India, Southeast Asia and China.

== Research Interest ==
Ethnopharmacology of medicinal plants in Asia Pacific; bioprospection, collection and identification of medicinal botanical samples and phytochemical and pharmacological study for the identification of lead compounds as novel antibacterial, anticancer, and antioxidant principles from rare plants from the rainforest of Southeast Asia.

== Published books ==
Christophe Wiart has authored several books of which:

- Wiart C., (2000), Medicinal Plants of Southeast Asia, Pelanduk Publisher, Kuala Lumpur.100pp.
- Wiart C. and Kumar A., (2000), Practical Handbook of Pharmacognosy, Prentice Hall, Kuala Lumpur.100pp
- Wiart C., (2002), Medicinal Plants of Southeast Asia, second edition, Prentice Hall, Kuala Lumpur. Preface of Professor Guy Mazars, (University Louis Pasteur, Strasbourg, President of The European Society of Ethnopharmacology) and reviewed by Professor Waterman (South Cross University, Australia).300pp.
- Wiart C (2005), “Antibacterial activity of medicinal plants used for traditional medicine in the State of Perak, Malaysia”. In Ethnomedicine, Der Grosse Leibeiker, Germany.
- Wiart C., (2006), Medicinal Plants of the Asia-Pacific: Drugs from the Future? WorldScientific, Singapore. Preface of Professor Norman Farnsworth (University of Illinois, USA), Professor Nina Etkin (University of Hawaii) and Professor Elizabeth Williamson (London, UK). 800pp.
- Wiart C., (2006), Ethnopharmacology of Medicinal Plants: Asia and the Pacific. Humana Press, USA. 400pp.
- Wiart C., (2006), Medicinal Plants of Asia and the Pacific CRC Press, USA. 300 pp.
- Wiart C.,(2009), Medicinal Plants from the East. University of Nottingham Press, UK. 800 pp.
- Wiart C., (2010), Medicinal Fruit Trees of Southeast Asia. In Genetic Resources, chromosome engineering, and crop improvement edited by Ram J. Singh. Vol. 6. CRC Press. USA (In Press)

== Television appearances ==
Dr. Christophe Wiart appeared on HBO's Vice in season 3, episode 6 (episode 28 of the series), titled "The Post-Antibiotic World & Indonesia's Palm Bomb." This episode aired on April 17, 2015. This episode highlighted the need to find new treatments for infections that were previously treatable with antibiotics, but are now resistant to multiple drugs. “The last hope for the human race’s survival, I believe, is in the rainforests of tropical Asia,” said ethnopharmacologist Dr. Christophe Wiart. “The pharmaceutical wealth of this land is immense.”
