= John Vaughan (plant scientist) =

Welsh food scientist

John Griffith Vaughan (5 May 1926 – 17 May 2005) was a Welsh food scientist. He was an expert in seed science, whose work linked the fields of botany and nutrition.

During nearly 40 years at the University of London, Vaughan pioneered new techniques for the study of seed proteins, became the leading expert on the structure and composition of oilseeds such as oilseed rape, and was widely consulted by industry. His expertise in identifying plant parts in animal and human foods was much sought after by flour millers and other food processors.

== Career ==
Born into modest circumstances in the industrial town of Merthyr Tydfil, Vaughan came to love plants as a boy, while walking in the Brecon Beacons. After grammar school, he entered the Victoria University of Manchester at the age of 17, to take a degree in botany. His first post was at a schoolteacher at Hele's School, Plympton, during which he published his first paper, and resolved on a career in research. After completing a Ph.D. thesis and lecturing, both at the then Chelsea Polytechnic, in 1958 Vaughan moved to Queen Elizabeth College, a college of the University of London situated in a leafy corner of Kensington. Initially in the College’s Department of Biology, he later moved to the Food Science department. The College merged with King's College London, in 1985, and in 1986 Vaughan was appointed as Professor of Food Microscopy.

== Teaching and research ==
During the 1970s and 1980s, when botany was increasingly displaced by trendier subjects, Vaughan did much to sustain research and teaching of plant science in London University, including the use of plant anatomy for identifying ancient seed remains at the Institute of Archaeology.

Much of Vaughan’s research was concerned with the genus Brassica, which includes many important crops, such as oilseed rape, cabbage, and mustard. Although very different in appearance, these crops are closely related and notoriously difficult to classify. In the 1960s Vaughan’s research team used the newly developed technique of electrophoresis to study the proteins of Brassica seeds, using similarities in their properties to clarify their taxonomic relationships. This pioneering interest in chemotaxonomy – the use of plant chemicals to study the classification of plants – led Vaughan to edit several books, including Seed Proteins and The Biology and Chemistry of the Cruciferae. These studies of seed composition were combined with work on seed structure, particularly of oilseeds. This led to the publication in 1970 of The Structure and Utilization of Oil Seeds, still the standard work on the subject.

== Retirement ==
After his retirement in 1991, Vaughan’s penchant for teaching and for multi-disciplinary work found a natural outlet in two books written for both mainstream and scientific audiences, the New Oxford Book of Food Plants (1997, with Catherine Geissler), and the Oxford Book of Health Foods (2003, with Pat Judd). The research for these was carried out in the library of the Royal Botanic Gardens, Kew, not far from his home in Petersham. Kew provided many of the plants painted specially for the New Oxford Book of Food Plants, and was the source of the historic illustrations used for the Oxford Book of Health Foods. These books achieved a rare synthesis of up-to-date and accessible scientific content, combined with beautiful illustrations of plants. As awareness increases of the role of plant foods in health, these books have established themselves as standard texts.

He died in Petersham, Surrey, on 17 May 2005.

== Key publications ==
- J. G. Vaughan. 1970. The structure and utilization of oil seeds. London: Chapman & Hall.
- J.G. Vaughan, A.J. MacLeod and B.M.G. Jones (eds). 1976. The biology and chemistry of the Cruciferae. London: Academic Press.
- J. G. Vaughan (ed.). 1979. Food microscopy. London: Academic Press.
- F.A. Bisby, J.G. Vaughan, C.A. Wright (eds). 1980. Chemosystematics: principles and practice. London: Published for the Systematics Association by Academic Press.
- J. Daussant, J. Mossé, J. Vaughan (eds). 1983. Seed proteins. London: Academic Press.
- J.G. Vaughan and C. Geissler. 1997. The New Oxford book of food plants : a guide to the fruit, vegetables, herbs and spices of the world. London: Oxford University Press.
- J.G. Vaughan and P.A. Judd. 2003. The Oxford book of health foods. Oxford: Oxford University Press.
