= Geology applications of Fourier transform infrared spectroscopy =

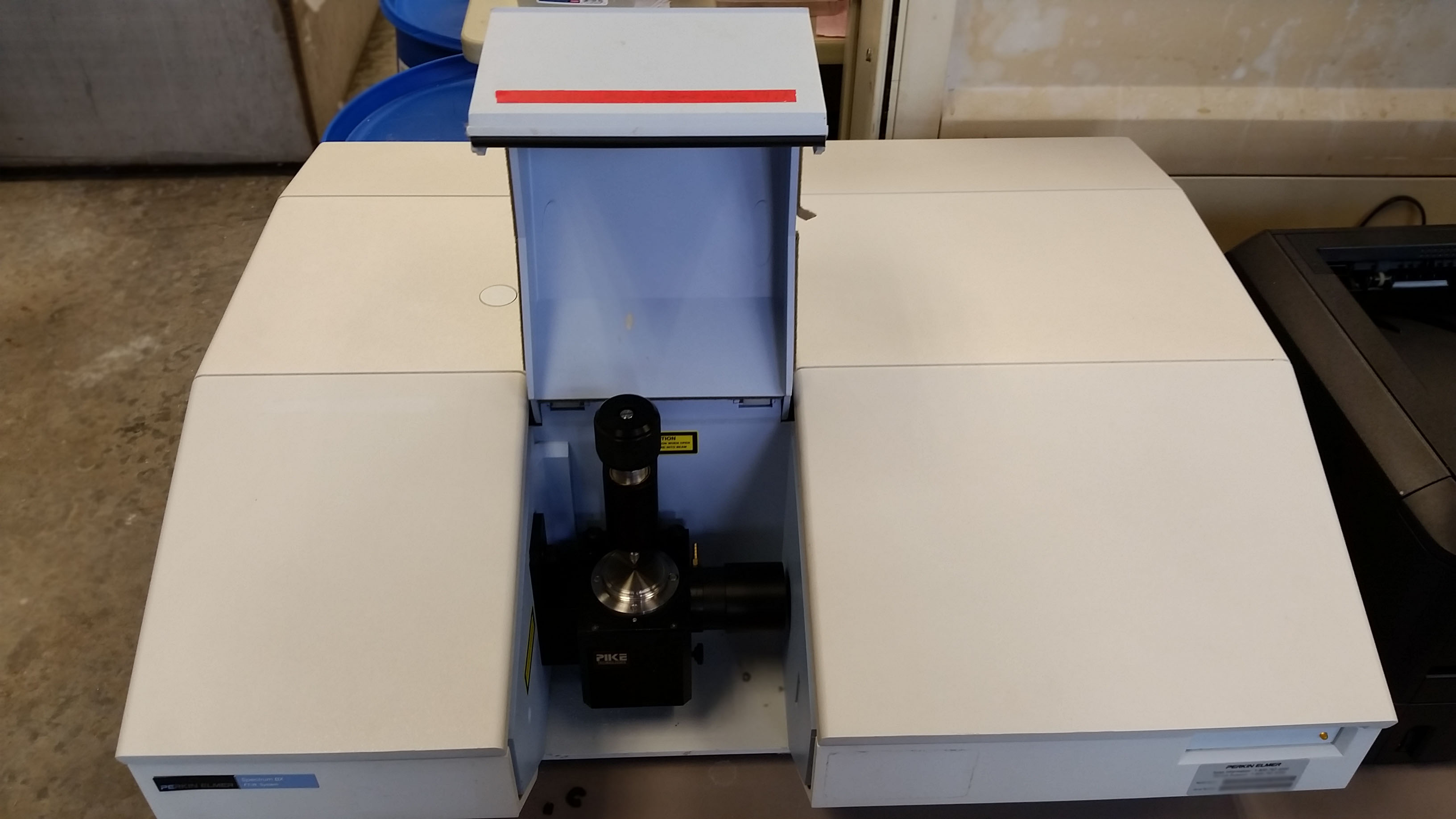
An attenuated total reflectance (ATR)-FTIR spectrometer.

Fourier transform infrared spectroscopy (FTIR) is a spectroscopic technique that has been used for analyzing the fundamental molecular structure of geological samples in recent decades. As in other infrared spectroscopy, the molecules in the sample are excited to a higher energy state due to the absorption of infrared (IR) radiation emitted from the IR source in the instrument, which results in vibrations of molecular bonds. The intrinsic physicochemical property of each particular molecule determines its corresponding IR absorbance peak, and therefore can provide characteristic fingerprints of functional groups (e.g. C-H, O-H, C=O, etc.).

In geosciences research, FTIR is applied extensively in the following applications:

- Analysing the trace amount of water content in Nominally anhydrous minerals (NAMs)
- Measuring volatile inclusions in glass and minerals
- Estimating the explosion potential in volcanic setting.
- Analysing chemotaxonomy of early life on Earth
- Linking biological affinities of both microfossils and macrofossils

These applications are discussed in details in the later sections. Most of the geology applications of FTIR focus on the mid-infrared range, which is approximately 4000 to 400 cm^{−1}.

== Instrumentation ==
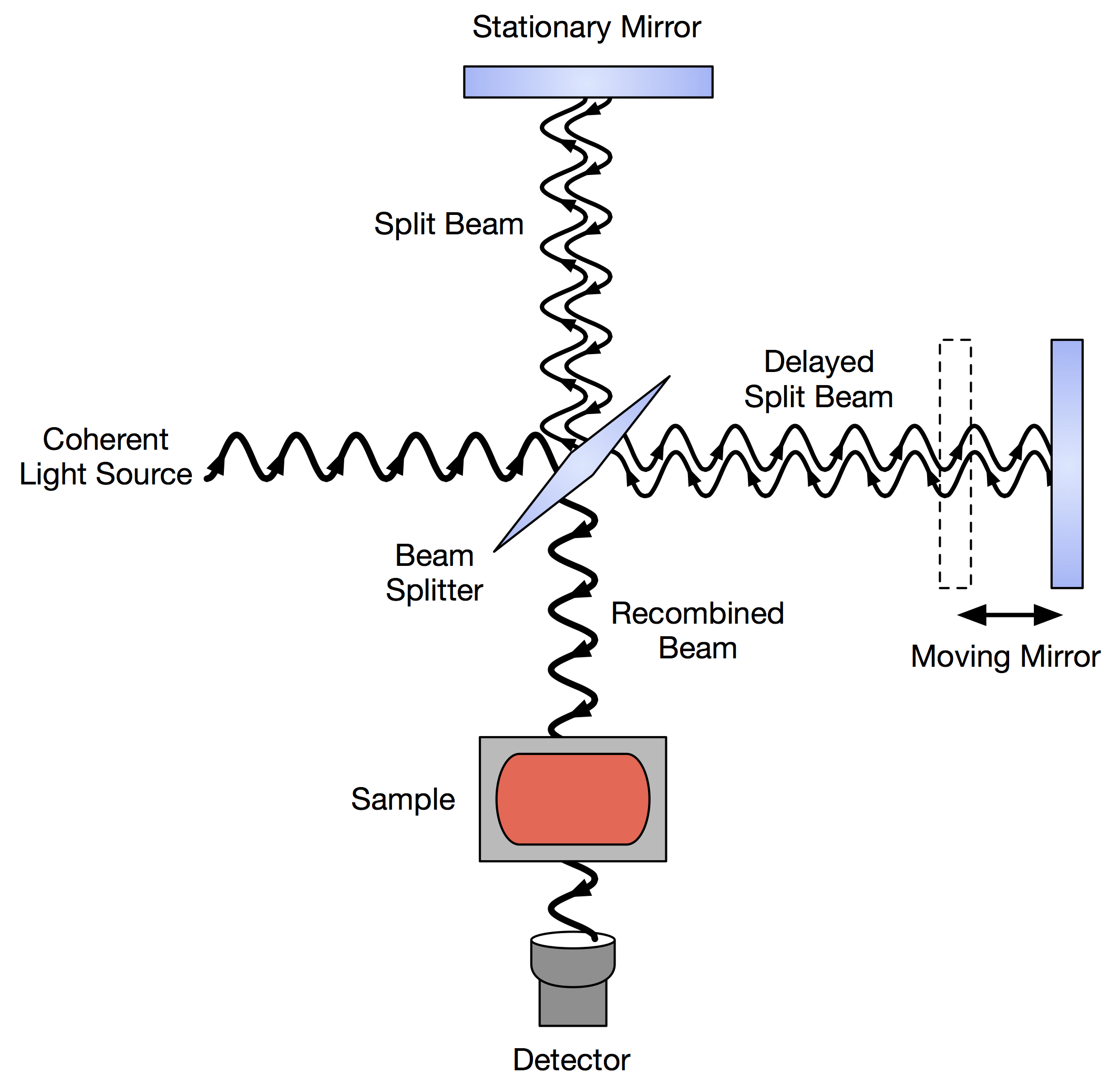
The basic components of a Michelson Interferometer: a coherent light source, a detector, a beam splitter, a stationary mirror and a movable mirror.

The fundamental components of a Fourier transform spectrometer include a polychromatic light source and a Michelson Interferometer with a movable mirror. When light goes into the interferometer, it is separated into two beams. 50% of the light reaches the static mirror and the other half reaches the movable mirror. The two light beams reflect from the mirrors and combine as a single beam again at the beam splitter. The combined beam travels through the sample and is finally collected by the detector. The retardation (total path difference) of the light beams between the static mirror and the movable mirror results in interference patterns. The IR absorption by the sample occurs at many frequencies and the resulting infereogram is composed of all frequencies except for those absorbed. A mathematical approach Fourier Transform converts the raw data into spectrum.

=== Advantages ===
- The FTIR technique uses a polychromatic beam of light with a wide range of continuous frequencies simultaneously, and therefore allows a much higher speed of scanning versus the conventional monochromatic dispersive spectroscopy.
- Without the slit used in dispersive spectroscopy, FTIR allows more light to enter the spectrometer and gives a higher signal-to-noise ratio, i.e. a less-disturbed signal.
- The IR laser used has a known wavelength and the velocity of the movable mirror can be controlled accordingly. This stable setup allows a higher accuracy for spectrum measurement.

== Sample characterization ==
Transmission FTIR, attenuated total reflectance (ATR)-FTIR, Diffuse reflectance infrared Fourier transform (DRIFT) spectroscopy and reflectance micro-FTIR are commonly used for sample analysis .

FTIR mode	Sample preparation	Schematic diagram
Transmission FTIR	Transmission mode is the most widely used FTIR technique in geoscience due to its high analysis speed and cost-efficient characteristics.; The sample, either a rock or a mineral, is cut into a block and polished on both sides until a thin (typically 300 to 15 μm) wafer is created. To ensure that enough light penetrates through the sample for analysis, the range of maximum thickness should be 0.5 to 1 mm; The sample is placed along the travel path of IR beam, in which the beam can penetrate through the sample and transmit to the detector.	Transmission FTIR Spectroscopy
ATR-FTIR	The IR beam interacts with the surface of the sample without penetrating into it. Therefore, sample thickness need not to be thin.; ATR-FTIR allows the functional group near the interface of the crystals to be analyzed when the IR radiation is totally internal reflected at the surface.; The sample is in direct contact with an ATR crystal. As the IR beam reaches onto the ATR crystal, it extends beyond the crystal surface and protrudes into the sample at a shallow depth (0.5-5 μm). The sample absorbs some of the energy of the IR beam as the wave is internally reflected between the ATR crystal and the sample. The attenuated wave at the exit end is collected by the detector.; This technique has an advantage in collecting quality data in the presence of water, therefore it is used to examine the aqueous components sorption at crystal interfaces.	ATR-FTIR Spectroscopy
DRIFT spectroscopy	Sample powder within KBr is generally used in DRIFT. The powdered specimen can simply be prepared by grinding and then mixed with the IR-transparent KBr powder in the sample cup.; The IR beam undergoes mupltiple reflection, i.e. diffuse reflection, that scatter in between the surface of the sample particles in the sample cup. The diffuse radiation is then focused again on a mirror when they exit and the combined IR beam carries the bulk sample information to the detector.	DRIFT Spectroscopy
Reflection-absorption FTIR	Sample is usually prepared as a thick block and is polished into a smooth surface.; As the IR beam strikes the sample surface, some of the energy is absorbed by the top layer (<10 μm) of the bulk sample. The altered incident beam is then reflected and carry the composition information of the targeted surface area. A mathematical correction called the Kramers–Kronig correction is required for generating the final spectrum.	Reflectance-Absorbance FTIR Spectroscopy

== Applications in geology ==
=== Volatiles diagnosis ===
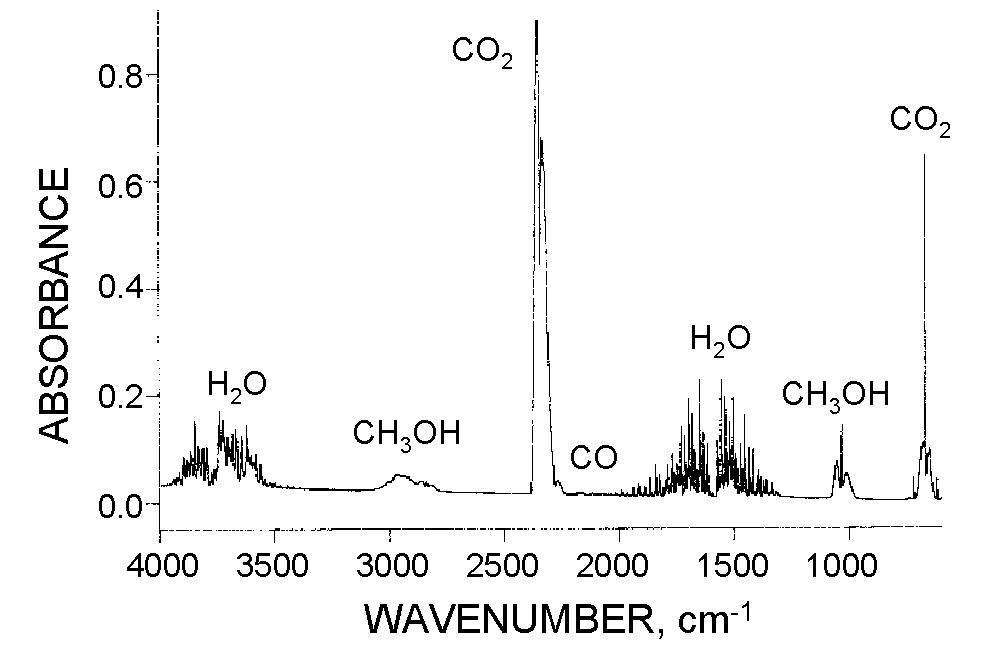
Example of an FTIR spectrum. The absorbance of some of the molecular structures shown in the spectrum: Total water at 3450cm-1, molecular water at 1630cm-1, carbon dioxide at 2350cm-1 and carbonate molecule at 1430cm-1.

The most commonly investigated volatiles are water and carbon dioxide as they are the primary volatiles to drive volcanic and magmatic processes. The absorbance of total water and molecular water is approximately 3450 cm-1 and 1630 cm-1. The peak height of the absorption bands for CO_{2} and CO_{3}^{2−} are 2350 cm^{−1} and 1430 cm^{−1} respectively. The phases of volatiles also give different frequency of bond stretch and eventually produce a specific wavenumber. For example, the band of solid and liquid CO_{2} occurs in between 2336 and 2345 cm^{−1}; and the CO_{2} gas phase shows two distinctive bands at 2338 cm^{−1} and 2361 cm^{−1}. This is due to the energy difference under vibrational and rotational motion of gas molecules.

The modified Beer-Lambert Law equation is commonly used in geoscience for converting the absorbance in the IR spectrum into the species concentration:

$\omega=\frac{AM}{l\varepsilon\rho}$

Where ω is wt. % of the species of interest within the sample; A is the absorbance of the species; M is the molar mass (in g mol^{−1}); ϵ is molar absorptivity (in L mol^{−1} cm ^{−1}); l is sample thickness (in cm); ρ is density (in g mol^{−1})

There are various applications of identifying the quantitative amount of volatiles by using spectroscopic technology. The following sections provide some of the examples:

==== Hydrous components in nominally anhydrous minerals ====
Nominally anhydrous minerals (NAMs) are minerals with only trace to minor amounts of hydrous components. The hydrous material occurs only at crystal defects. NAMs chemical formulas are normally written without hydrogen. NAMs such as olivine and orthopyroxene account for a large proportion in the mantle volume. Individual minerals may contain only a very low content of OH but their total weight can contribute significant as the H_{2}O reservoir on Earth and other terrestrial planets. The low concentration of hydrous components (OH and H_{2}O) can be analyzed with Fourier Transform spectrometer due to its high sensitivity. Water is thought to have significant role in affecting mantle rheology, either by hydrolytic weakening to the mineral structure or by lowering the partial melt temperature. The presence of hydrous components within NAMs can therefore (1) provide information on the crystallization and melting environment in the initial mantle; (2) reconstruct the paleoenvironment of early terrestrial planet.

==== Fluid and melt inclusions ====
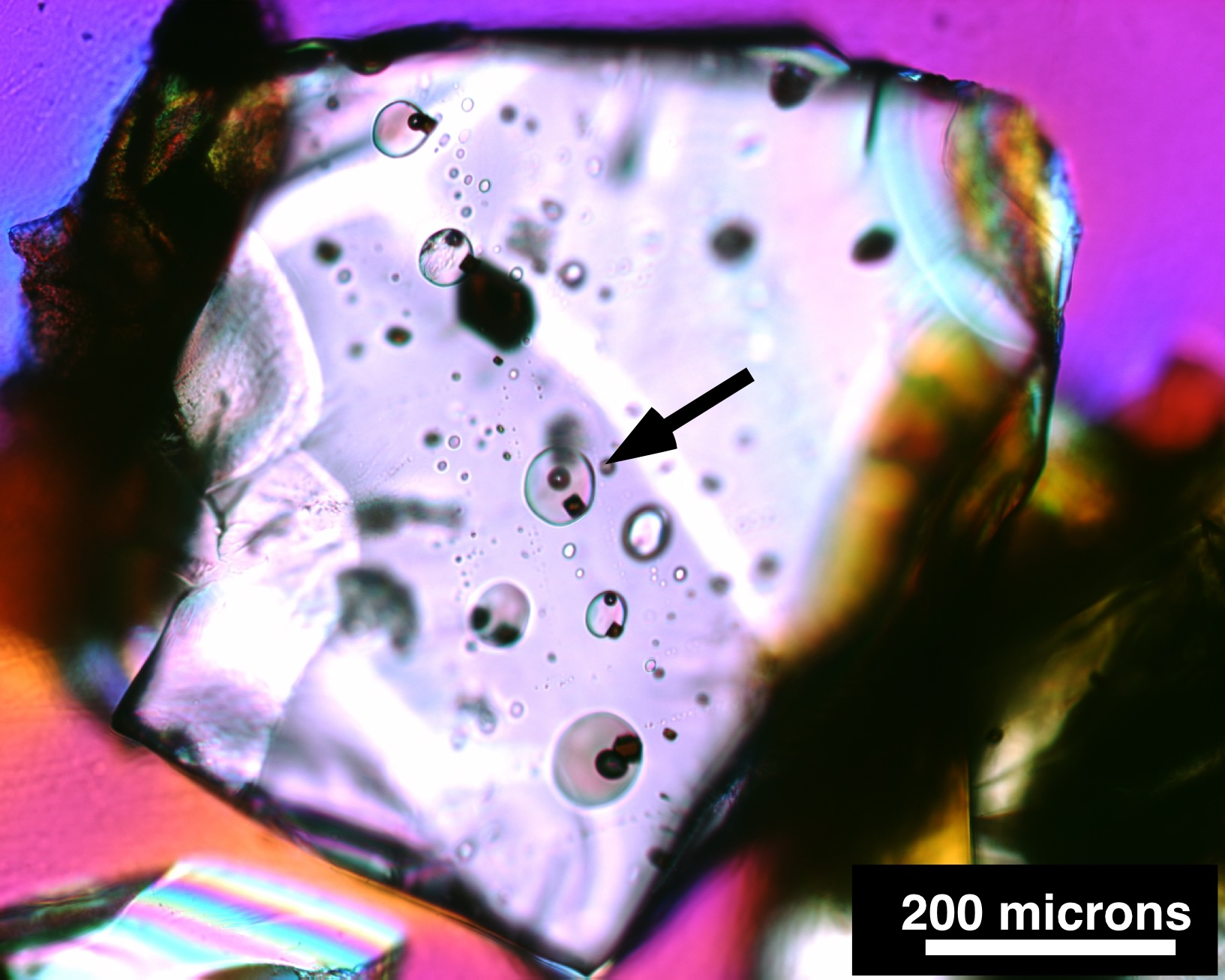
Multiple melt inclusions in olivine crystal

Inclusion refers to the small mineral crystals and foreign fluids within a crystal. Melt inclusions and fluid inclusions can provide physical and chemical information of the geological environment in which the melt or fluid are trapped within the crystal. Fluid inclusion refers to the bubble within a mineral trapping volatiles or microscopic minerals within it. For melt inclusions, it refers to the parent melt of the initial crystallization environment being held as melt parcel within a mineral. The inclusions preserved original melt and therefore can provide the magmatic condition where the melt is near liquidus. Inclusions can be particularly useful in the petrological and volcanological studies.

The size of inclusions is usually microscopic (μm) with a very low concentration of volatile species. By coupling a synchrotron light source to the FTIR spectrometer, the diameter of the IR beam can be significantly reduced to as small as 3 μm. This allows a higher accuracy in detecting the targeted bubbles or melt parcels only without contamination from the surrounding host mineral.

By incorporating the other parameters, (i.e. temperature, pressure and composition), obtained from micro thermometry, electron and ion microprobe analyzers, it is able to reconstruct the entrapment environment and further infer the magma genesis and crustal storage. The above approach of FTIR has successfully detect the occurrence of H_{2}O and CO_{2} in numbers of studies nowaday, For examples, the water saturated inclusion in olivine phenocryst erupted at Stromboli (Sicily, Italy) in consequences of depressurization, and the unexpected of occurrence of molecular CO_{2} in melts inclusion in Phlegraean Volcanic District (Southern Italy) revealed as the presence of a deep, CO_{2}-rich, continuous degassing magma.

==== Evaluate the explosive potential volcanic dome ====
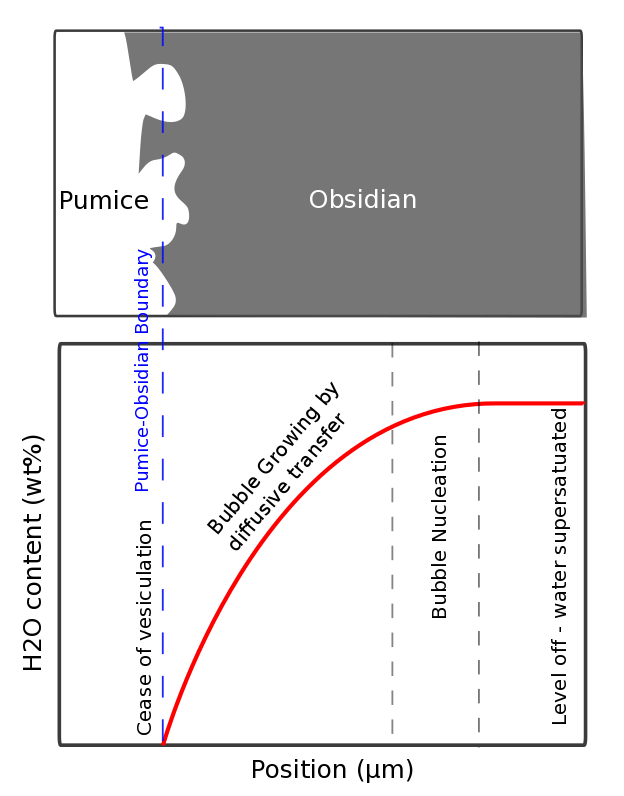
Schematic diagram of Water concentration profile across a pumice-obsidian sample. The shape of the profile can be translate into a diffusion timescale.

Vesiculation, i.e. the nucleation and growth of bubbles commonly initiates eruptions in volcanic domes. The evolution of vesiculation can be summarized in these steps:

1. The magma becomes progressively saturated with volatiles when water and carbon dioxide dissolves in it. Nucleation of bubbles start when then magma is supersaturated with these volatiles.
2. Bubbles continue to grow by diffusive transfer of water gases from the magma. Stresses buildup inside the volcanic dome.
3. The bubbles expand in consequence to the decompression of magma and explosions occur eventually. This terminates the vesiculation.

In order to understand the eruption process and evaluate the explosive potential, FTIR spectromicroscopy is used to measure millimeter-scale variations in H_{2}O on obsidian samples near the pumice outcrop. The diffusive transfer of water from the magma host has already completed in the highly vesicular pumice which volatiles escapes during explosion. On the other hand, water diffusion has not yet completed in the glassy obsidian formed from cooling lava and therefore the evolution of volatiles diffusion is recorded within these samples. The H_{2}O concentration in obsidian measured by FTIR across the samples increase away from the vesicular pumice boundary. The shape of the curve in the water concentration profile represent a volatile-diffusion timescale. The vesiculation initiation and termination is thus recorded in the obsidian sample. The diffusion rate of H_{2}O can be estimated based on the following 1D diffusion equation.

$\frac{\partial C}{\partial t}=\frac{\partial}{\partial x}\left ( D(C,T,P) \frac{\partial C}{\partial x} \right )$

D(C, T, P): the Diffusivity of H_{2}O in melt, which has an Arrhenian dependence on Temperature (T), Pressure (P) and H_{2}O Content (C).

When generating the diffusion model with the diffusion equation, the temperature and pressure can be fixed to a high-temperature and low-pressure condition which resemble the lava dome eruption environment. The maximum H_{2}O content measured from FTIR spectrometer is substituted into the diffusion equation as the initial value that resembles a volatile supersaturated condition. The duration of the vesiculation event can be controlled by the decrease of water content across a distance in the sample as the volatiles escape into the bubbles. The more gradual change of the water content curve represents a longer vesiculation event. Therefore, the explosive potential of volcanic dome can be estimated from the water content profile derived from the diffusive model.

=== Establishing taxonomy of early life ===
For the large fossil with well-preserved morphology, paleontologists might be able to recognize it relatively easily with their distinctive anatomy. However, for microfossils that has simple morphology, compositional analysis by FTIR is an alternative way to better identify the biological affinities of these species. The highly sensitive FTIR spectrometer can be used to study microfossils which only have small amount of specimens available in nature. FTIR result can also assist the development of plant fossil chemotaxonomy.

Aliphatic C-H stretching bands in the 2900 cm^{−1}, aromatic C-Cring stretching band at 1600 cm^{−1}, C=O bands at 1710 cm^{−1} are some of the common target functional groups examined by the paleontologists. CH_{3}/CH_{2} is useful for distinguishing different groups of organism (e.g. Archea, bacteria and eucarya), or even the species among the same group (i.e. different plant species).

==== Linkage between acritarchs and microfossil taxa ====
Acritarchs are microorganism characterized by their acid-resistant organic-walled morphology and they existed from Proterozoic to the present. There is no consensus on the common descent, the evolutionary history and the evolutionary relationship of acritarchs. They share similarity to cells or organelles with different origins listed below:

- Cysts of eukaryotes: Eukaryotes are by definition organisms with cells that consists of a nucleus and other cellular organelles enclosed within a membrane. The cysts is a dominant stage in many microeukaryotes such as bacterium, that consists of a strengthened wall to protect the cell under unfavorable environment.
- Prokaryotic sheath: the cell wall of the single-celled organism that lacks all the membrane-bounded organelles such as the nucleus;
- Algae and other vegetative parts of multicellular organisms;
- Crustacean egg cases.

Acritarchs samples are collected from drill core in places where Proterozoic microfossils have been reported, e.g. Roper Group (1.5–1.4 Ga) and Tanana Formation (ca. 590–565 Ma) in Australia, Ruyang Group, China (around 1.4–1.3 Ga). Comparison of the chain length and presence of structure in modern eukaryotic microfossil and the acritarchs suggests possible affinities between some of the species. For example, the composition and structure of the Neoproterozoic acritarch Tanarium conoideum is consistent with algaenans, i.e. the resistant wall of green algae made up of long-chained methylenic-polymer that can withstand changing temperature and pressure throughout the geological history. Both of the FTIR spectra obtained from Tanarium conoideum and algaenans exhibit IR absorbance peaks at methylene CH_{2} bend (c. 1400 cm^{−1} and 2900 cm^{−1}).

==== Chemotaxonomy of plant fossils ====
The micro-structural analysis is a common way to complement with the conventional morphology taxonomy for plant fossils classification. FTIR spectroscopy can provide insightful information in the microstructure for different plant taxa. Cuticles is a waxy protective layer that covers plant leaves and stems to prevent loss of water. Its constituted waxy polymers are generally well-preserved in plant fossil, which can be used for functional group analysis. For example, the well-preserved cuticle of cordaitales fossils, an extinct order of plant, found in Sydney, Stellarton and Bay St. George shows similar FTIR spectra. This result confirms the previous morphological-based studies that all these morphologic similar cordaitales are originated from one single taxon.
