= Mantle wedge =

Triangular section of mantle between a subducting and overriding tectonic plate

A mantle wedge is a triangular shaped piece of mantle that lies above a subducting tectonic plate and below the overriding plate. A wedge can be identified using seismic velocity imaging as well as earthquake maps. Subducting oceanic slabs carry large amounts of water; this water lowers the melting temperature of the above mantle wedge. Melting of the wedge can also be contributed to depressurization due to the flow in the wedge. This melt gives rise to associated volcanism on the Earth's surface. This volcanism can be seen around the world in places such as Japan and Indonesia.

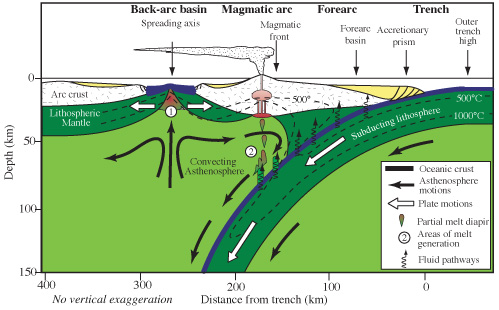

== Charateristics ==
=== Structure ===
The forearc mantle extends from where the subducting slab meets the cold nose of the mantle wedge, at depths from 10 to 40 km. Low seismic attenuation and high seismic velocities characterize this region. There is a boundary between this low attenuation region and a high attenuation region on the forearc side of the arc volcanoes. To image the mantle wedge region below volcanic arcs P-wave, S-wave and seismic attenuation images should be used in coordination. These tomographic images show a low velocity, high attenuation region above the subducting slab. The slowest velocities in these volcanic arc regions are Vp= 7.4 km·s^{−1} and Vs= 4 km·s^{−1}. Mantle wedge regions that do not have associated arc volcanism do not show such low velocities. This can be attributed to the melt production in the mantle wedge.

Studies have shown that magmas that produce island arcs are more oxidized than the magmas that are produced at mid-ocean ridges. This relative degree of oxidation has been determined by the iron oxidation state of fluid inclusions in glassy volcanic rocks. It has been determined that this state of oxidation is correlated with the water content of the mantle wedge. Water is a poor oxidant, and therefore the oxidizing agent must be transported as a dissolved ion in the subducting slab.

Magmas produced in subduction zone regions have high volatile contents. This water is derived from the breakdown of hydrous minerals in the subducting slab, as well as water in the oceanic plate from percolation of seawater. This water rises from the subducting slab to the overriding mantle wedge. The water lowers the melting temperature of the wedge and leaves behind melt inclusions that can be measured in the associated arc volcanic rocks.

=== Flow ===
Flow has important effects on the thermal structure, overall mantle circulation, and melt within the wedge. Minerals are anisotropic and have the ability to align themselves within the mantle when exposed to strain. These mineral alignments can be seen using seismic imaging, as waves will travel through different orientations of a mineral at different speeds. Shear strain associated with mantle flow will align the fast direction of pyroxene and olivine grains in the direction of flow. This is the most common theory on flow within the mantle, although opposing theories do exist. Flow within the mantle wedge is parallel to the crust until it reaches the relatively cooler nose of the wedge, then is overturned and is parallel to the subducting slab. The nose of the wedge is generally isolated from the overall mantle flow.
