= Fluid inclusion =

Liquid and/or gas trapped within a crystal

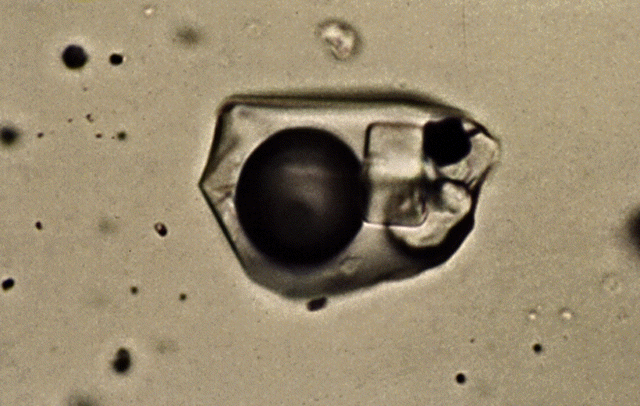
Trapped in a time capsule the same size as the diameter of a human hair, the ore-forming liquid in this inclusion was so hot and contained so much dissolved solids that when it cooled, crystals of halite, sylvite, gypsum, and hematite formed. As the samples cooled, the fluid shrank more than the surrounding mineral, and created a vapor bubble. Source: USGS

A fluid inclusion is a bubble of fluid that is trapped within a crystal. As minerals often form from a liquid or aqueous medium, tiny bubbles of that liquid can become trapped within the crystal, or along healed crystal fractures. These inclusions usually range in size from 0.01 mm to 1 mm and are only visible in detail by microscopic study, however specimens of fenster or skeletal quartz may include thin sheet-like inclusions that are many millimetres in length and breadth within their lamellar voids.

These inclusions occur in a wide variety of environments. For example, they are found within cementing minerals of sedimentary rocks, in gangue minerals such as quartz or calcite in hydrothermal circulation deposits, in fossil amber, and in deep ice cores from the Greenland and Antarctic ice caps. The inclusions can provide information about the conditions existing during the formation of the enclosing mineral. Fourier transform infrared spectroscopy and Raman spectroscopy can be used to determine the composition of fluid inclusions.

== Formation ==
Hydrothermal ore minerals, which typically form from high temperature aqueous solutions, trap tiny bubbles of liquids or gases when cooling and forming solid rock. The trapped fluid in an inclusion preserves a record of the composition, temperature and pressure of the mineralizing environment. An inclusion often contains two or more phases. If a vapor bubble is present in the inclusion along with a liquid phase, simple heating of the inclusion to the point of resorption of the vapor bubble gives a likely temperature of the original fluid. If minute crystals, such as halite, sylvite, hematite or sulfides, are present in the inclusion, they provide direct clues as to the composition of the original fluid.

== Fluid inclusions and mineral exploration ==
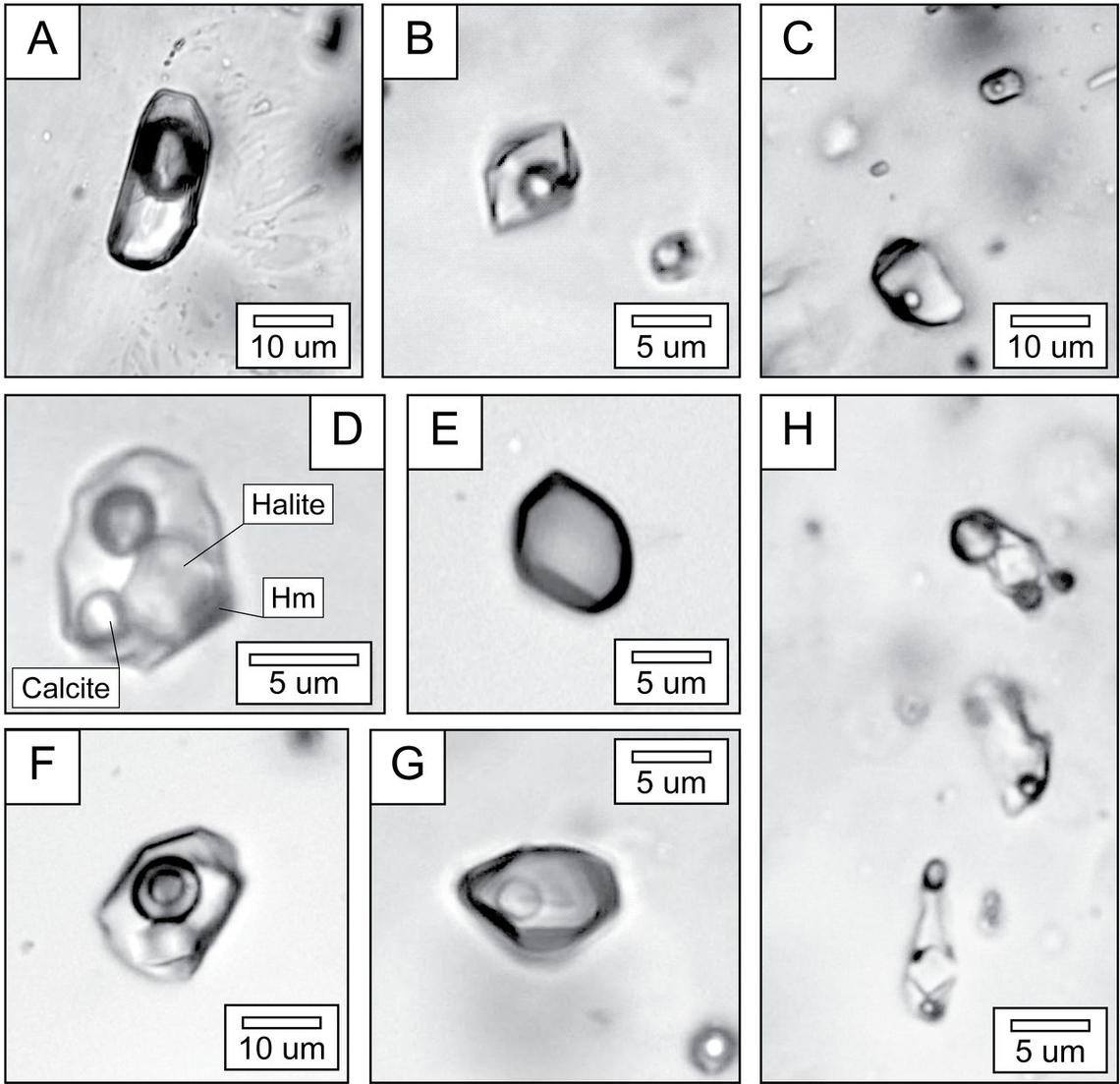
Photomicrographs from Pea Ridge, MO, USA of secondary fluid inclusions in apatite (image A) and quartz (images B–H).

Fluid inclusions can provide useful data in mineral exploration, as their characteristics depend on the mineralization process. The methods of using fluid inclusions to identify mineral deposits include assessing the abundance of a specific inclusion type, looking into variations in the inclusions' temperatures of phase changes during heating and cooling, and variations in other properties such as decrepitation behavior, and inclusions chemistry. Observation and point-counting of thin-sections of samples is used to identify the occurrence of specific inclusion types. If an abundance of similar fluid inclusions are found in close geographic proximity, one can conclude that the surrounding rock types are similar if not the same. Microthermometric properties (changes in temperature during phase changes) are used to characterize and categorize areas that witnessed thermal activity during mineral formation.

Fluid inclusions have been used to identify deposits of oil and gas. Drilling cuts, cores, and/or outcrop materials are preserved for their pore-fluids, and the chemistry of the fluid is analyzed with Fluid Inclusion Stratigraphy (FIS). FIS analysis takes the spectrometric reading of a fluid inclusion's volatile species; these are indicative of a natural gas or oil deposit nearby. The abundance of similar fluid inclusions could, however, be attributed to hydrocarbon migration and accumulation, so other techniques are used to confirm the presence of the oil deposit after initial detection of fluid inclusions.

=== Extraterrestrial ===
Fluid inclusions were initially reported in Apollo samples. However, this was quickly determined to be Houston water.

The Sutter's Mill meteorite contains fluid inclusions.

Fluid inclusions have been reported in samples from (162173) Ryugu and (101955) Bennu.

== Metamorphic signatures ==
In the recent years, fluid inclusion research has been extensively applied to understand the role of fluids in the deep crust and crust-mantle interface. Fluid inclusions trapped within granulite facies rocks have provided important clues on the petrogenesis of dry granulite facies rocks through the influx of CO_{2}-rich fluids from sub-lithospheric sources. CO_{2}-rich fluid inclusions were also recorded from a number of ultra high temperature granulite facies terranes, suggesting the involvement of CO_{2} in extreme crustal metamorphism. Some recent studies speculate that CO_{2} derived by sub-solidus decarbonation reactions during extreme metamorphism has contributed to the deglaciation of the snowball Earth.

== Orogenic application ==
Fluid inclusions trapped in veins and minerals have been used as a proxy to explore the deformation history in orogenic belts. As fluid activities are considerably more in shear zones in an orogenic belt, the fluid inclusions in a shear zone have been also used to explore the seismic activities during the evolution of the shear zone. In orogenic belts the earthquakes sometimes attributed to be linked with fluid activity at depth. Indirect geophysical evidence points out the role of fluid in earthquakes in many shear zones, however a few studies provide geological evidence for the role of fluid in earthquakes.

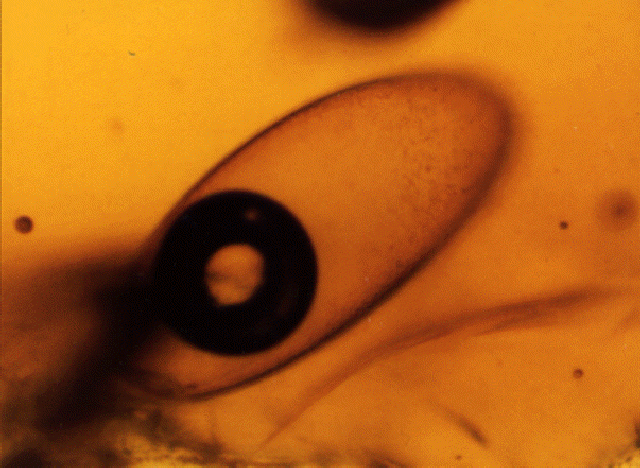
This 84-million-year-old air bubble lies trapped in amber (fossilized tree sap). Using a quadrupole mass spectrometer, scientists can learn what the atmosphere was like when the dinosaurs roamed the earth. Source: USGS

== Paleoclimate applications ==
Trapped bubbles of air and water within fossil amber can be analyzed to provide direct evidence of the climate conditions existing when the resin or tree sap formed. The analysis of these trapped air bubbles provides a record of atmosphere composition going back 140 million years. The data indicate that the oxygen content of the atmosphere reached a high of nearly 35% during the Cretaceous Period and then plummeted to near present levels during the early Tertiary. The abrupt decline corresponds to or closely follows the Cretaceous–Paleogene extinction event and may be the result of a major meteorite impact that created the Chicxulub Crater.

In paleoceanography studies, fluid inclusions can inform about the chemical composition of seawater. The trapped seawater in sediments evaporates and leaves behind the salt content. The depth at which these evaporites are found relative to the composition of the trapped salt allows oceanographers to reconstruct seawater evolution. Air bubbles trapped within the deep ice caps can also be analyzed for clues to ancient climate conditions.

== See also ==
- Melt inclusions
- Inclusion (mineral)
