= Chemotaxonomy =

Method of biological classification

Merriam-Webster defines chemotaxonomy as the method of biological classification based on similarities and dissimilarity in the structure of certain compounds among the organisms being classified. Advocates argue that, as proteins are more closely controlled by genes and less subjected to natural selection than the anatomical features, they are more reliable indicators of genetic relationships. The compounds studied most are proteins, amino acids, nucleic acids, peptides etc.

Physiology is the study of working of organs in a living being. Since working of the organs involves chemicals of the body, these compounds are called biochemical evidences. The study of morphological change has shown that there are changes in the structure of animals which result in evolution. When changes take place in the structure of a living organism, they will naturally be accompanied by changes in the physiological or biochemical processes.

John Griffith Vaughan and Victor Plouvier were among the pioneers of chemotaxonomy.

== Biochemical products ==
The body of any animal in the animal kingdom is made up of a number of chemicals. Of these, only a few biochemical products have been taken into consideration to derive evidence for evolution.

1. Protoplasm: Every living cell, from a bacterium to an elephant, from grasses to the blue whale, has protoplasm. Though the complexity and constituents of the protoplasm increases from lower to higher living organism, the basic compound is always the protoplasm. Evolutionary significance: From this evidence, it is clear that all living things have a common origin point or a common ancestor, which in turn had protoplasm. Its complexity increased due to changes in the mode of life and habitat.
2. Nucleic acids: DNA and RNA are the two types of nucleic acids present in all living organisms. They are present in the chromosomes. The structure of these acids has been found to be similar in all animals. DNA always has two chains forming a double helix, and each chain is made up of nucleotides. Each nucleotide has a pentose sugar, a phosphate group, and nitrogenous bases like adenine, guanine, cytosine, and thymine. RNA contains uracil instead of thymine. It has been proved in the laboratory that a single strand of DNA of one species can match with the other strand from another species. If the alleles of the strands of any two species are close, then it can be concluded that these two species are more closely related.
3. Digestive enzymes are chemical compounds that help in digestion. Proteins are always digested by a particular type of enzymes like pepsin, trypsin, etc., in all animals from a single celled amoeba to a human being. The complexity in the composition of these enzymes increases from lower to higher organisms but are fundamentally the same. Likewise, carbohydrates are always digested by amylase, and fats by lipase.
4. End products of digestion: Irrespective of the type of animal, the end products of protein, carbohydrates and fats are amino acids, simple sugars, and fatty acids respectively. It can thus be comfortably concluded that the similarity of the end products is due to common ancestry.
5. Hormones are secretions from ductless glands called the endocrine glands like the thyroid, pituitary, adrenal, etc. Their chemical nature is the same in all animals. For example, thyroxine is secreted from the thyroid gland, irrespective of what the animal is. It is used to control metabolism in all animals. If a human being is deficient in thyroxine, it is not mandatory that this hormone should be supplemented from another human being. It can be extracted from any mammal and injected into humans for normal metabolism to take place. Likewise, insulin is secreted from the pancreas.
  If the thyroid gland from a tadpole is removed and replaced with a bovine thyroid gland, normal metabolism will take place and the tadpole will metamorphose into a frog. As there is a fundamental relationship among these animals, such exchange of hormones or glands is possible.
6. Nitrogenous Excretory Products: Mainly three types of nitrogenous waste is excreted by living organisms; ammonia is a characteristics of aquatic life form, urea is formed by the land and water dwellers, uric acid is excreted by terrestrial life forms. A frog, in its tadpole stage excretes ammonia just like a fish. When it turns into an adult frog and moves to land, it excretes urea instead of ammonia. Thus an aquatic ancestry to land animal is established.
  A chick on up to its fifth day of development excretes ammonia; from its 5th to 9th day, urea; and thereafter, uric acid. Based on these findings, Baldwin sought a biochemical recapitulation in the development of vertebrates with reference to nitrogenous excretory products.
7. Phosphagens are energy reservoirs of animals. They are present in the muscles. They supply energy for the synthesis of ATP. Generally, there are two types of phosphagens in animals, phosphoarginine (PA) in invertebrates and phosphocreatine (PC) in vertebrates. Among the echinoderms and prochordates, some have PA and others PC. Only a few have both PA and PC. Biochemically, these two groups are related. This is the most basic proof that the first chordate animals should have been derived only from echinoderm-like ancestors.
8. Body fluid of animals: When the body fluids of both aquatic and terrestrial animals are analyzed, it shows that they resemble sea water in their ionic composition. There is ample evidence that primitive members of most of the phyla lived in the sea in Paleozoic times. It is clear that the first life appeared only in the sea and then evolved onto land. A further point of interest is that the body fluids of most animals contain less magnesium and more potassium than the water of the present-day ocean. In the past, the ocean contained less magnesium and more potassium. Animals' bodies accumulated more of these minerals due to the structure of DNA, and this characteristic remains so today. When the first life forms appeared in the sea, they acquired the composition of the contemporary sea water, and retained it even after their evolution onto land, as it was a favorable trait.
9. Opsins: In the vertebrates, vision is controlled by two very distinct types of opsins, porphyropsin and rhodopsin. They are present in the rods of the retina. Fresh water fishes have porphyropsin; marine ones and land vertebrates have rhodopsin. In amphibians, a tadpole living in fresh water has porphyropsin, and the adult frog, which lives on land most of the time, has rhodopsin. In catadromous fish, which migrate from fresh water to the sea, the porphyropsin is replaced by rhodopsin. In an anadromous fish, which migrates from the sea to freshwater, the rhodopsin is replaced by porphyropsin. These examples show the freshwater origin of vertebrates. They then deviated into two lines, one leading to marine life and the other to terrestrial life.
10. Serological evidence: In recent years, experiments made in the composition of blood offer good evidence for evolution. It has been found that blood can be transmitted only between animals that are closely related. The degree of relationship between these animals is determined by what is known as the serological evidence. There are various methods of doing so; the method employed by George Nuttall is called the precipitation method. In this method, anti-serum of the involved animals has to be prepared. For human study, human blood is collected and allowed to clot. Then, the serum is separated from the erythrocytes. A rabbit is then injected with a small amount of serum at regular intervals, which is allowed to incubate for a few days. This forms antibodies in the rabbit's body. The rabbit's blood is then drawn and clotted. The serum separated from the red blood cells is called the anti-human serum.

When such a serum is treated with that of blood of monkeys or apes, a clear white precipitate is formed. When the serum is treated with the blood of any other animal like dogs, cats, or cows, no precipitate appears. It can thus be concluded that humans are more closely related to monkeys and apes. As a result, it has been determined that lizards are closely related to snakes, horses to donkeys, dogs to cats, etc. This systematic position of Limulus was controversial for a long time, but has been found to show that human serum is more closely related to arachnids than to crustaceans.

The field of biochemistry has greatly developed since Darwin's time, and this serological study is one of the most recent pieces of evidence of evolution. A number of biochemical products like nucleic acids, enzymes, hormones and phosphagens clearly show the relationship of all life forms. The composition of body fluid has shown that the first life originated in the oceans. The presence of nitrogenous waste products reveal the aquatic ancestry of vertebrates, and the nature of visual pigments points out the fresh water ancestry of land vertebrates. Serological tests indicate relationships within these animal phyla.

== Paleontology ==
When only fragments of fossils, or some biomarkers remain in a rock or oil deposit, the class of organisms that produced it can often be determined using Fourier transform infrared spectroscopy
