= Melt inclusion =

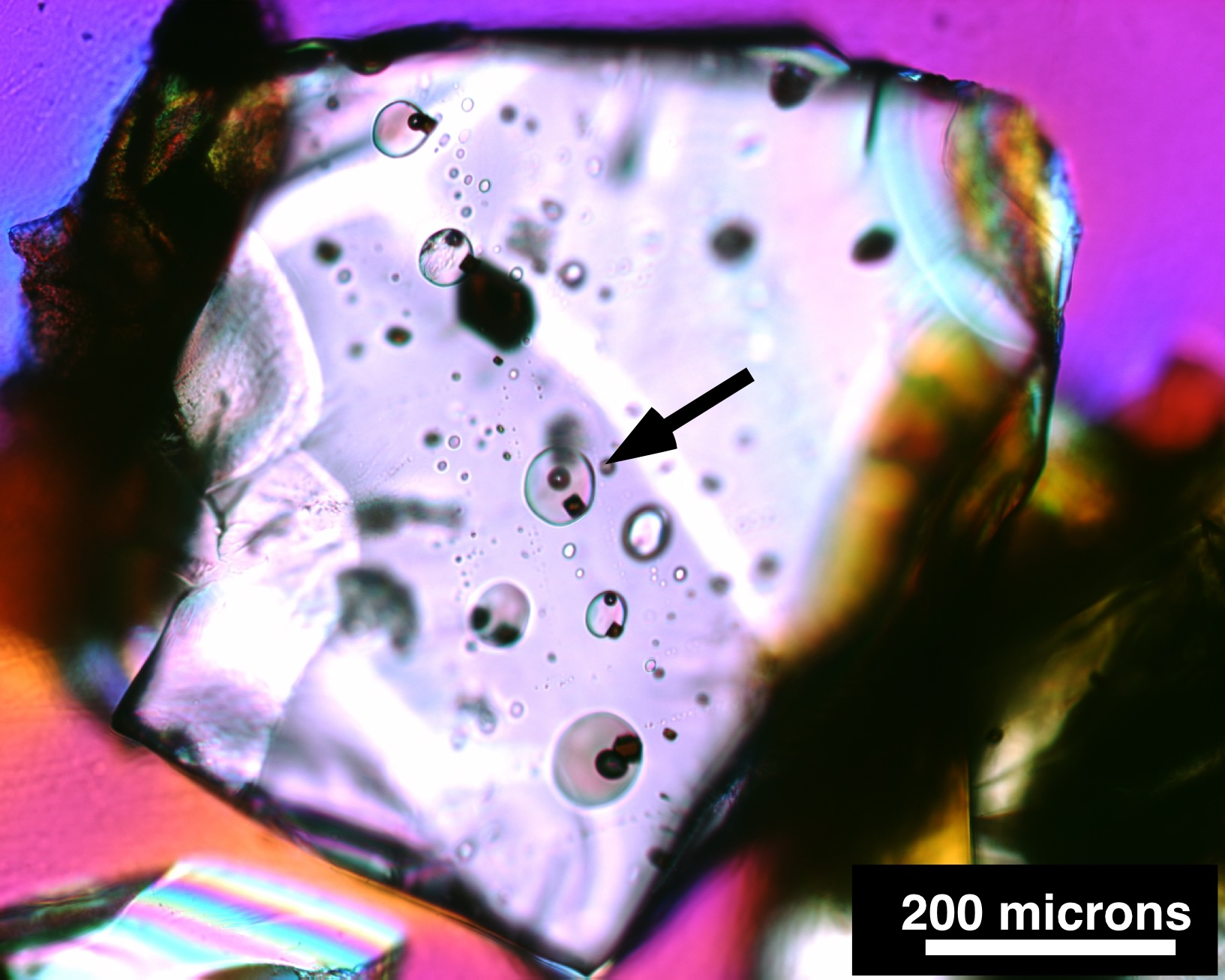
Multiple melt inclusions in an olivine crystal. Individual inclusions are oval or round in shape and consist of clear glass, together with a small round vapor bubble and in some cases a small square spinel crystal. The black arrow points to one good example, but there are several others. The occurrence of multiple inclusions within a single crystal is relatively common

A melt inclusion is a small parcel or "blobs" of melt(s) that is entrapped by crystals growing in magma and eventually forming igneous rocks. In many respects, it is analogous to a fluid inclusion within magmatic hydrothermal systems. Melt inclusions tend to be microscopic in size (10-80 µm) and can be analyzed for volatile contents that are used to interpret trapping pressures of the melt at depth.

== Characteristics ==
Melt inclusions are generally small - most are less than 80 micrometres across (a micrometre is one thousandth of a millimeter, or about 0.00004 inches). They may contain a number of different constituents, including glass (which represents melt that has been quenched by rapid cooling), small crystals and a separate vapour-rich bubble. They occur in the crystals that can be found in igneous rocks, such as for example quartz, feldspar, olivine, pyroxene, nepheline, magnetite, perovskite and apatite. Melt inclusions can be found in both volcanic and plutonic rocks. In addition, melt inclusions can contain immiscible (non-miscible) melt phases and their study is an exceptional way to find direct evidence for presence of two or more melts at entrapment.

== Analysis ==
Although they are small, melt inclusions can provide an abundance of useful information. Using microscopic observations and a range of chemical microanalysis techniques geochemists and igneous petrologists can obtain a range of unique information from melt inclusions. Various techniques are used in analyzing melt inclusion compositions. Volatile elements (H_{2}O and CO_{2}) are analyzed with Secondary Ion Mass Spectroscopy (SIMS), double-sided transmission FTIR, single-sided reflectance FTIR. These volatile compositions track storage depths of magmas, crystallization, volcanic degassing, and rates of ascent or decompression during eruption. Major, minor, and trace elements are often analyzed by electron microprobe analysis (EMPA), Laser Ablation-Inductively Coupled Plasma Mass Spectrometry (LA-ICPMS), Scanning Electron Microscopy (SEM), and Secondary Ion Mass Spectroscopy (SIMS). If there is a vapor bubble present within the melt inclusion, analysis of the vapor bubble with Raman spectroscopy or microthermometry, or alternatively experimental rehomogenization must be performed when reconstructing the total volatile budget of the melt inclusion.

=== Microthermometry ===
Microthermometry is the process of reheating a melt inclusion to its original melt temperature and then rapidly quenching to form a homogenous glass phase free of daughter minerals or vapor bubbles that may have been originally contained within the melt inclusion.

==== Microscope-mounted high temperature stage heating ====
Stage heating is the process of heating a melt inclusion on a microscope-mounted stage and flowing either helium gas (Vernadsky stage) or argon gas (Linkam TS1400XY) over the stage and then rapidly quenching the melt inclusion after it has reached its original melt temperature to form a homogenous glass phase. Use of a heating stage allows for observation of changing phases of the melt inclusion as it is reheated to its original melt temperature.

==== One atmosphere vertical furnaces ====
This process allows for reheating of one or more melt inclusions in a furnace held at a constant pressure of one atmosphere to their original melt temperatures and then rapidly quenching in water to produce a homogenous glass phase.

=== Fourier transform infrared spectroscopy (FTIR) ===
FTIR is an analytical method which uses an infrared laser focused on a spot on the glass phase of the melt inclusion to determine the concentrations of H_{2}O (dissolved as OH⁻ or molecular H_{2}O) and CO_{2} (dissolved as CO_{2} or CO_{3}²⁻). The absorption (or extinction) coefficient associated with wavelengths for each species of H_{2}O and CO_{2} depending on the parent lithology that contained the melt inclusion is used to reconstruct concentrations, with the Beer-Lambert Law. Determining the baseline to these volatile peaks has been done with linear baselines, splines, flexicurves, and more recently with Bayesian sampling for error analysis.

=== Raman spectroscopy ===
Raman spectroscopy is similar to FTIR in using a focused laser on the glass phase of the melt inclusion or a vapor bubble that may be contained in the melt inclusion to identify wavelengths associated with the Raman vibrating bands of volatiles, such as H_{2}O and CO_{2}. Raman spectroscopy can also be used to determine the density of CO_{2} contained in a vapor bubble if present at a high enough concentration within a melt inclusion.

=== Secondary Ion Mass Spectrometry (SIMS) ===
SIMS is used to determine volatile and trace element concentrations by aiming an ion beam (^{16}O^{−} or ^{133}Cs^{+}) at the melt inclusion to produce secondary ions that can be measured by a mass spectrometer.

=== Laser Ablation-Inductively Coupled Plasma Mass Spectrometry (LA-ICPMS) ===
LA-ICP-MS can determine major and trace elements, however, with LA-ICPMS, the melt inclusion and any accompanying materials within the melt inclusion are ionized, thus destroying the melt inclusion, and then analyzed with a mass spectrometer. This is often used as a final stage of analysis, as the melt inclusion subsequently cannot be analyzed.

=== Scanning Electron Microscopy (SEM) ===
Scanning electron microscopy is a useful tool to employ before any of the above analyses that may result in loss of the original material since it can be used to check for daughter minerals or vapor bubbles and help determine the best technique that should be chosen for melt inclusion analysis.

=== Electron Microprobe Analysis (EPMA) ===
Electron microprobe analysis is ubiquitous in the analysis of major and minor elements in melt inclusions and provide oxide concentrations used in determining parental magma types of the melt inclusions and phenocryst hosts. Compositional information is useful in determining the extent of post-entrapment crystallization or melting.

=== X-ray microtomography ===
Melt inclusions have been imaged in three dimensions using X-ray microtomography. This method can be used to determine the dimensions of different phases present in melt inclusions more precisely than by using visible light microscopy.

== Interpretation ==
=== Volatile Concentrations ===
Melt inclusions can be used to determine the composition, compositional evolution and volatile components of magmas that existed in the history of magma systems. This is because melt inclusions act as a tiny pressure vessel that isolates and preserves the ambient melt surrounding the crystal before they are modified by later processes, such as post-entrapment crystallization. Given that melt inclusions form at varying pressures (P) and temperatures (T), they can also provide important information about the entrapping conditions (P-T) at depth and their volatile contents (H_{2}O, CO_{2}, S, Cl, and F) that drive volcanic eruptions.

==== Vapor Bubbles ====
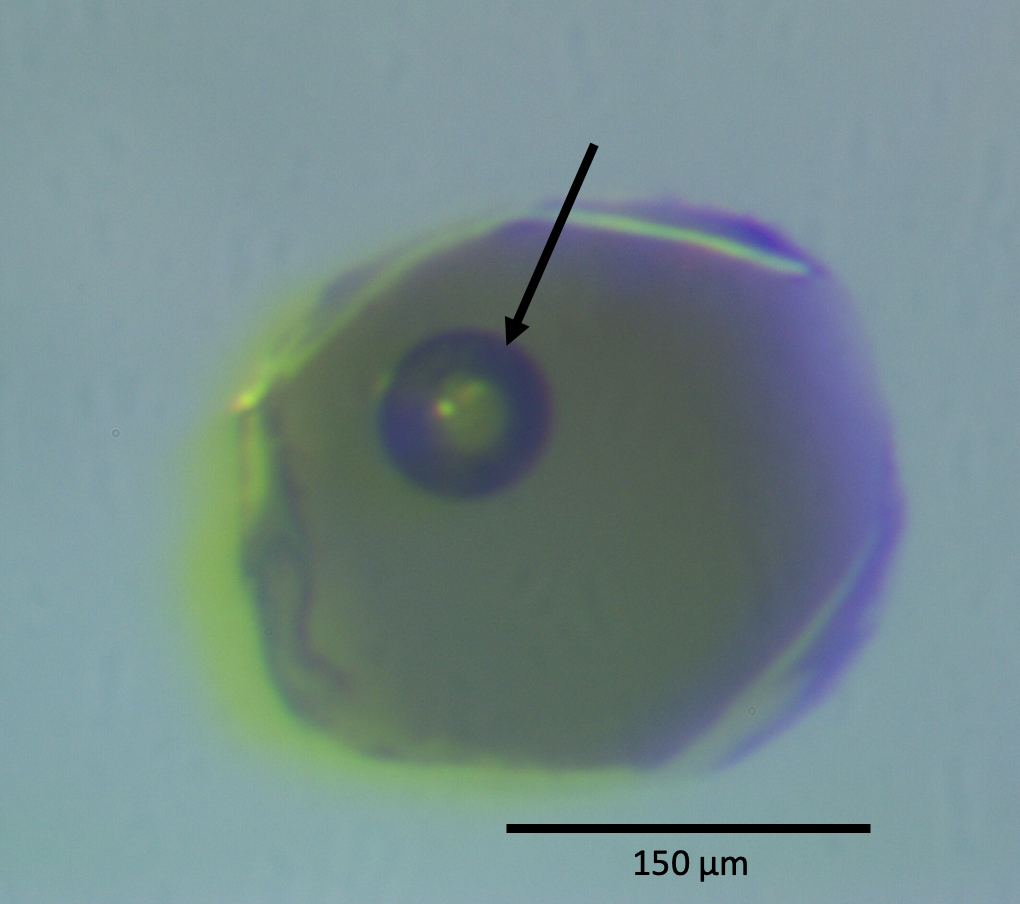
Melt inclusion with accompanying vapor bubble from an olivine crystal. Collected from ash related to the 1992 eruption of Cerro Negro Volcano, Nicaragua

Animation of a melt inclusion viewed in transmitted light.

The presence of a vapor bubble adds an additional component for analysis given that the vapor bubble could contain a significant proportion of the H_{2}O and CO_{2} originally in the melt sampled by the melt inclusion. If the vapor bubble is composed primarily of CO_{2}, Raman spectroscopy can be used to determine the density of CO_{2} present or experimental rehomogenization can dissolve the CO_{2} in vapor back to the melt.

=== Major, minor and trace element concentrations ===
Major and minor element concentrations are generally determined using EPMA and common element compositions include Si, Ti, Al, Cr, Fe, Mn, Mg, Ca, Ni, Na, K, P, Cl, F and S. Knowledge of the oxide concentrations related to these major and minor elements can help to determine the composition of the parental magma, the melt inclusion and the phenocryst hosts.

Trace element concentrations can be measured by SIMS analysis with resolution in some cases as low as 1 ppm. LA-ICPMS analyses can also be used to determine trace element concentrations, however lower resolution compared to SIMS does not provide determination of concentrations as low as 1 ppm.

== Olivine-hosted Melt Inclusions ==
Olivine ((Mg,Fe)_{2}Si O_{4}) is generally the first mineral to crystallize in magmatic and volcanic systems following the Bowen's reaction series. As such, olivine-hosted melt inclusions can be of utility in recording magmatic processes in systems where limited crystallization has occurred, such as in volcanic eruptions. Additionally, olivine-hosted melt inclusions can record magma compositions and volatile content prior to the magma being significantly modified by fractional crystallization, assimilation, degassing or any other magmatic processes. For these reasons, olivine-hosted melt inclusions are a useful tool commonly utilized by geologists to better understand magmatic and volcanic systems.

=== Hydrogen Diffusion and Water Loss in Olivine and Olivine-hosted Melt Inclusions ===
Experiments indicate that hydrogen diffusion via H^{+} can occur on the timescales of minutes to hours at temperatures as low as 800-1000 °C within the olivine crystal lattice (e.g., Mackwell and Kohlstedt, 1990). That hydrogen diffusion occurs at different rates along different crystallographic axes in the olivine crystal lattice, such that D_{[100]} >D_{[010]} >D_{[001]} (Barth et al., 2023; Mackwell and Kohlstedt, 1990) and oxygen fugacity was shown to have no effect on diffusion rates in olivine. High diffusion rates of hydrogen in olivine and an insensitivity to oxygen fugacity on diffusion rates suggests that hydrogen diffusion occurs as proton diffusion (H^{+}) via the interstitial mechanism, as well as occupying silicon and metal sites.

Experiments have illuminated the mechanisms by which hydrogen diffuses in olivine-hosted melt inclusions, concluding that hydrogen diffusion in olivine-hosted melt inclusions utilizes material exchange between the crystal olivine and the melt inclusion itself. Specifically, they conclude that the formation or destruction of olivine with vacancies in the metallic site (that holds Fe and Mg) can assist in the dehydration or hydration of melt inclusions. For melt inclusion dehydration, the following reactions occur:

${\ce{2H2O + SiO2 -> H4SiO4}}$

${\ce{H2O + SiO2 + MgO -> MgH2SiO4}}$

${\ce{H2O + Fe2O3 + 2SiO2 -> H4SiO4}}$

The above reactions indicate that hydrogen diffusion in melt inclusions involves silica, and that the major element composition of melt inclusions can be affected by both dehydration and hydration.

==== Implications for Geology ====
The mechanisms and rates of diffusion of hydrogen in olivine and olivine-hosted melt inclusions provide important context for chemical composition data collected by researchers. For example, the fast diffusion rates of hydrogen in olivine are important to consider when analyzing a xenolith that originated in the mantle. As a mantle rock ascends to the surface, it will reach pressures where lower amounts of hydrogen will be able to be dissolved in the olivine. However, temperatures will likely remain high enough for significant diffusion to occur. As such, many olivine grains are likely significantly degassed of their water content by the time they reach the surface. Additionally, because silica compositions are affected by melt inclusion hydration and dehydration, changes in parental melt composition and extent of dehydration can be determined by compositional discrepancies between melt inclusions and host rocks.

The presence of water as hydrogen is an important constraint of mantle mechanical properties. Water stored in olivine crystal defects can affect the strength of olivine. This water content can then in turn affect the rheology of the mantle. Because hydrogen diffusivity is related to olivine electrical conductivity, which is in turn related to water content, determining the hydrogen diffusion history of an olivine crystal can provide constraints on the water content of the magma from which it was sourced.

Hydrogen diffusion in olivine can also be used to determine the rate at which magma was decompressed during a volcanic eruption. Magma degasses water as it ascends due to encountering lower pressures and therefore lower water solubilities, exsolving into a vapor bubble. This degassing results in water diffusing out of olivine crystals as they encounter disequilibrium conditions. The diffusion of water out of the olivine crystal will result in a water concentration gradient from the core to the rim of the olivine crystal.

The water concentrations can be measured using microanalytical techniques, such as FTIR or SIMS, and the rate of diffusion can be modelled mathematically. The resulting diffusion profile (Figure) allows for determination of the rate of decompression that the crystal experienced, and thus the rate of magma ascent during a volcanic eruption. This in turn allows for assessment of the explosivity of a volcanic event.

Crystallization of phases within the melt inclusion can occur after its entrapment. This is known as post-entrapment crystallization. The changes in melt inclusion compositions that result from this process can be corrected with different models, considering a hydrated or dehydrated melt inclusion. However, this process is mainly related to the diffusion between two elements, Fe and Mg, rather than diffusion of hydrogen. The interdiffusion between both elements is recorded as 'Fe-Loss' or 'Fe-Gain' depending on if the crystal was cooled or heated. These temperature effects were studied experimentally, and can also reflect a change in hydrogen diffusion rates. Therefore, it is important to consider the effects of post-entrapment crystallization and to correct for these effects. The correction allows for accurate results and interpretations to be gathered from melt inclusion data.

== History ==
Henry Clifton Sorby, in 1858, was the first to document microscopic melt inclusions in crystals. The study of melt inclusions has been driven more recently by the development of sophisticated chemical analysis techniques. Scientists from the former Soviet Union lead the study of melt inclusions in the decades after World War II, and developed methods for heating melt inclusions under a microscope, so changes could be directly observed. A.T. Anderson explored analysis of melt inclusions from basaltic magmas from Kilauea Volcano in Hawaii to determine initial volatile concentrations of magma at depth.

== See also ==
- Inclusion (mineral)
- Fluid Inclusion
