= Inclusion (mineral) =

Material trapped inside a mineral during formation

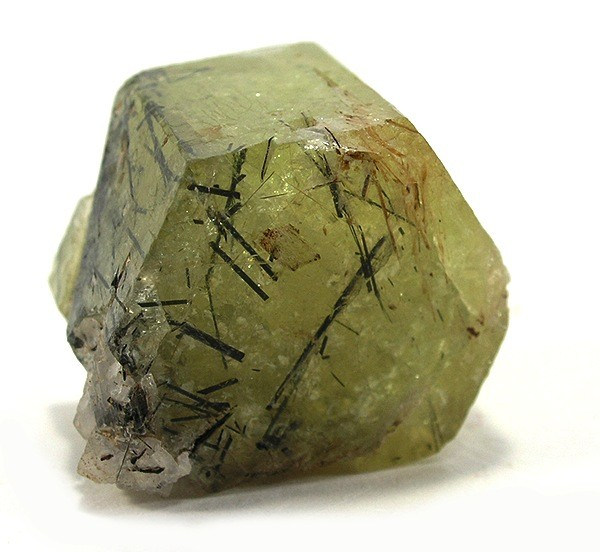
Dark inclusions of aegerine in light-green apatite

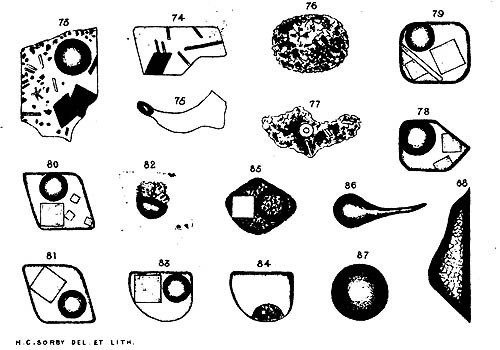
Sketch showing different shapes of inclusions

An inclusion in mineralogy is any material trapped inside a mineral during its formation. In gemology, it is an object enclosed within a gemstone or reaching its surface from the interior. According to James Hutton's law of inclusions, fragments included in a host rock are older than the host rock itself. The term is also used in metallurgy.

== Mineralogy ==
Inclusions are usually rocks or other minerals, less often water, gas or petroleum. Liquid and vapor create fluid inclusions. In amber, insects and plants are common inclusions.

The analysis of atmospheric gas bubbles as inclusions in ice cores is an important tool in the study of climate change.

A xenolith is a preexisting rock which has been picked up by a lava flow. Melt inclusions form when bits of melt become trapped inside crystals as they form in the melt.

== Gemology ==
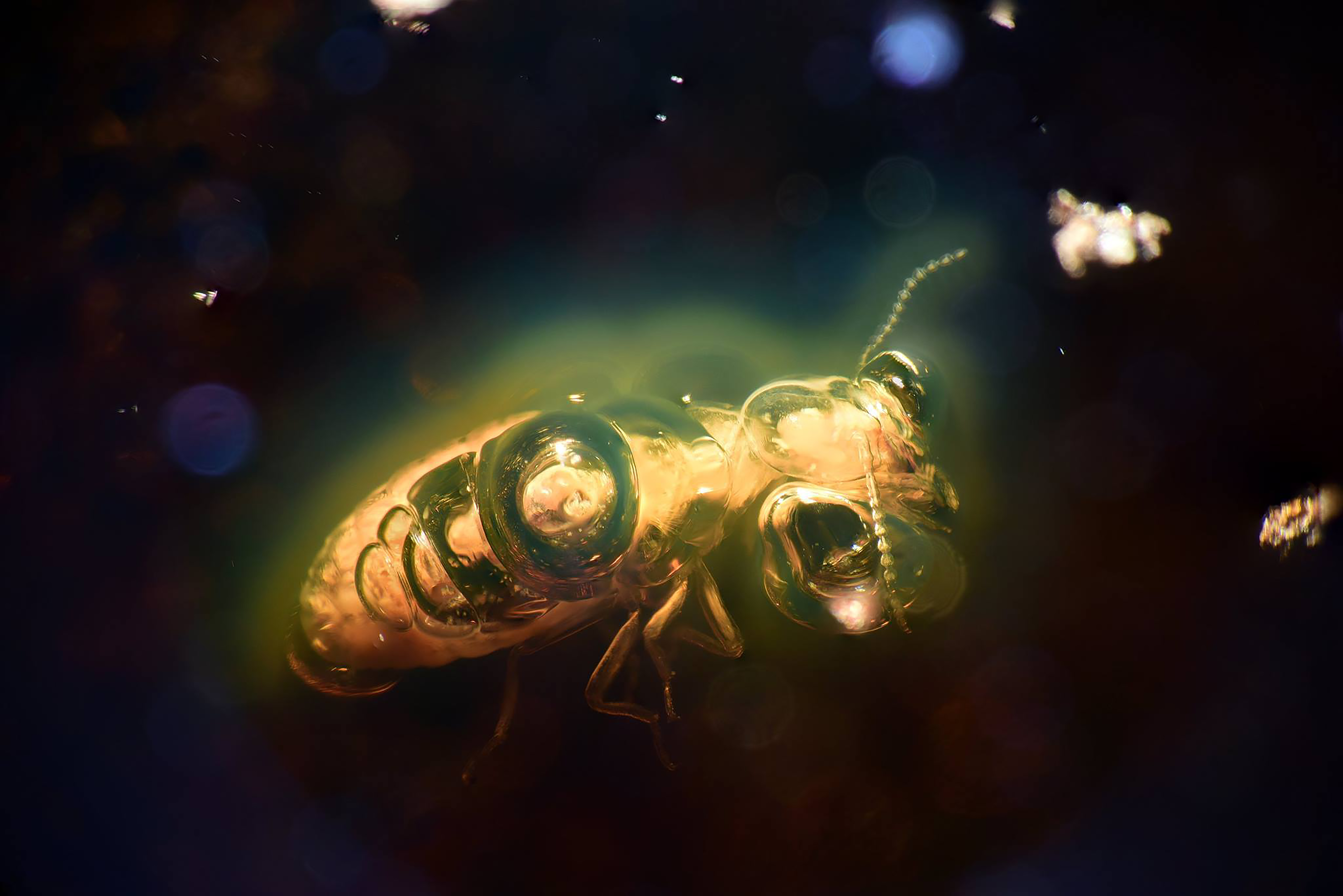
An insect encased in amber, has gas bubbles protruding from its thorax and head.

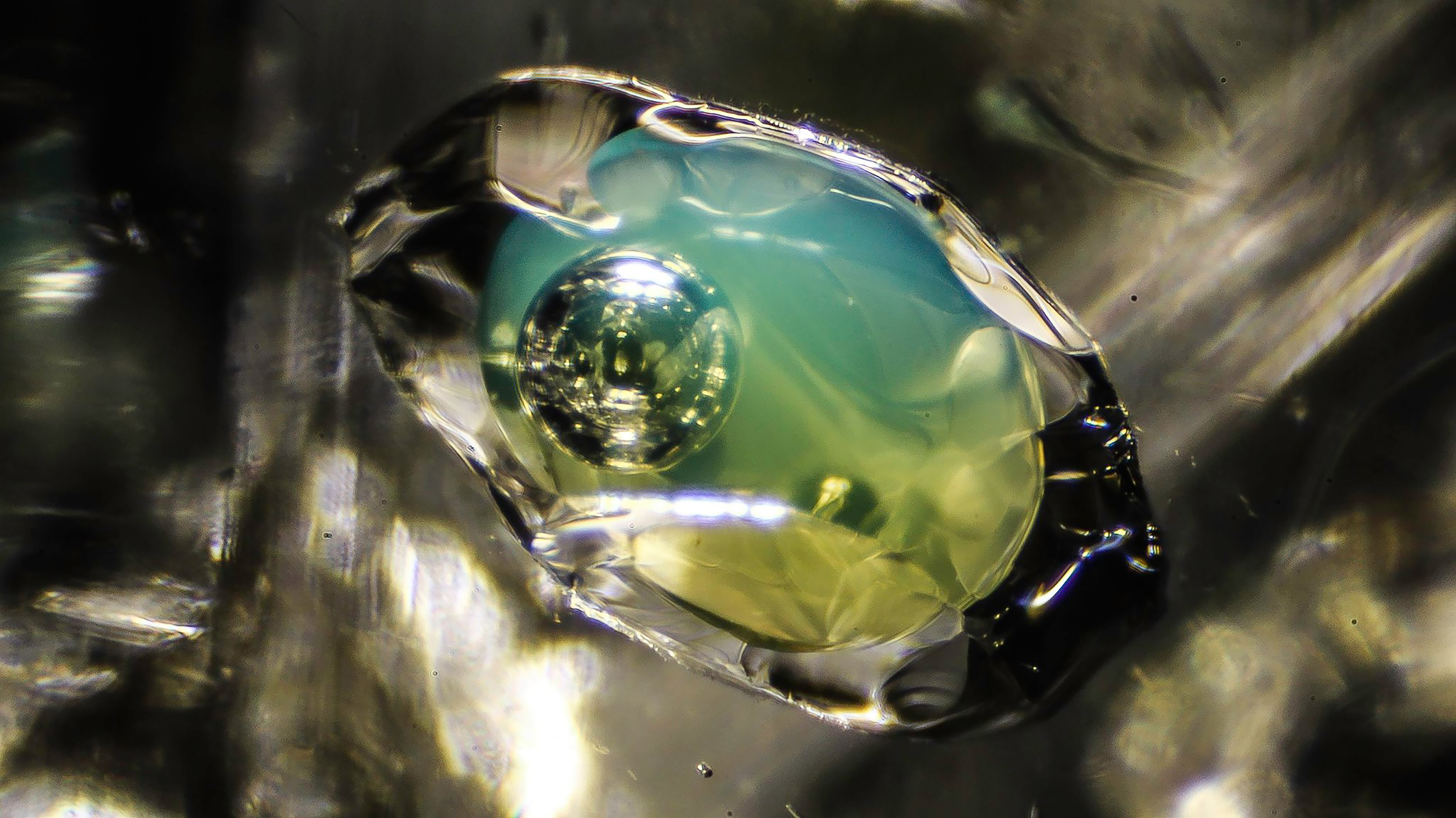
The term three phase relates to the three phases of matter, solid, liquid, and gas. This is a three phase inclusion in rock crystal quartz. The solid is a black material that is of bituminous origin. The liquid encased is petroleum, and the gas bubble is methane.

Inclusions are one of the most important factors when it comes to gem valuation. They diminish the clarity and value of many gemstones, such as diamonds, and increase the value of others, such as star sapphires.

Many colored gemstones are expected to have inclusions which do not greatly affect their values. They are categorized into three types:

- Type I colored gems, such as aquamarines, topaz and zircon, have very few or no inclusions.
- Type II colored gems, such as sapphire, ruby, garnet and spinel, often have a few inclusions.
- Type III colored gems, such as emerald and tourmaline, almost always have inclusions.
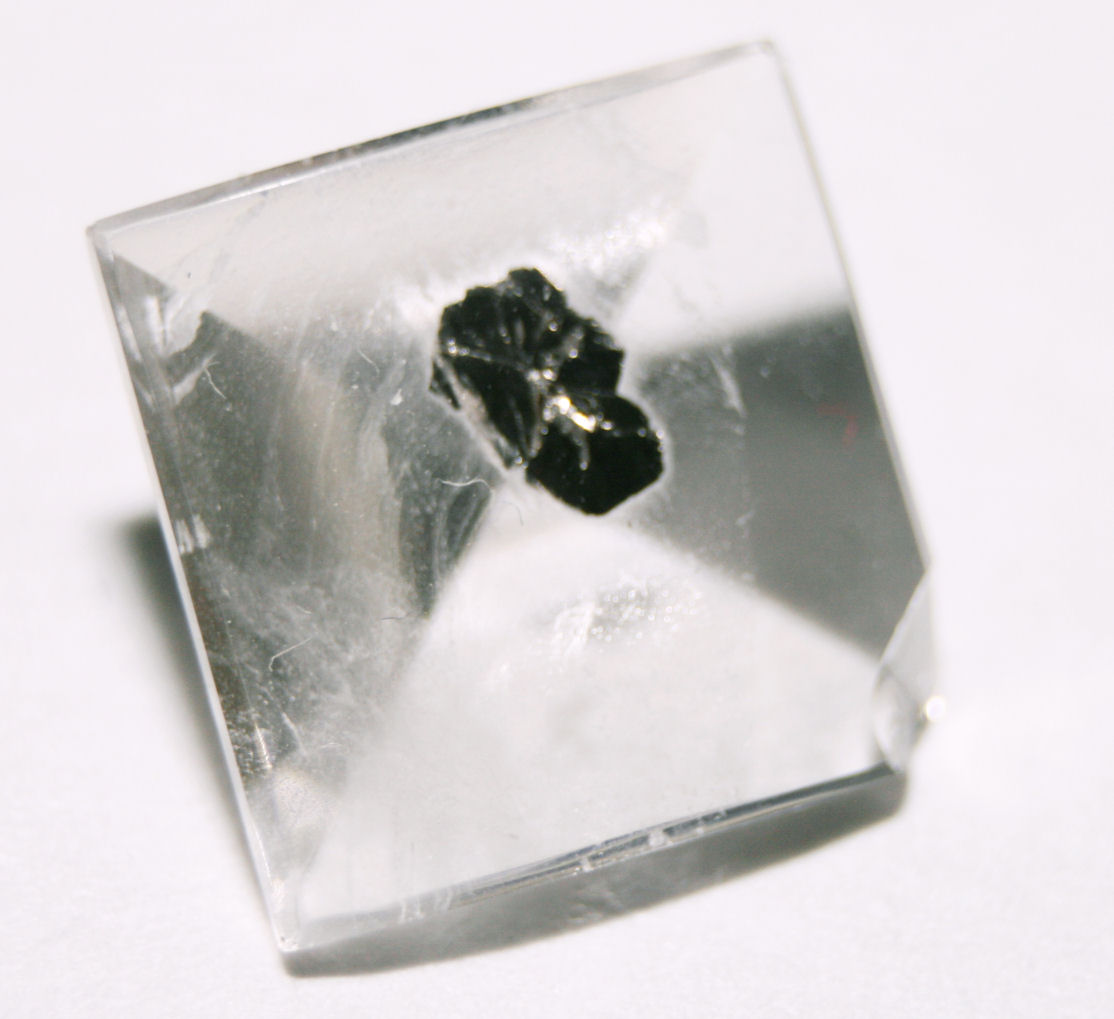
Clear gemstone with metallic inclusion

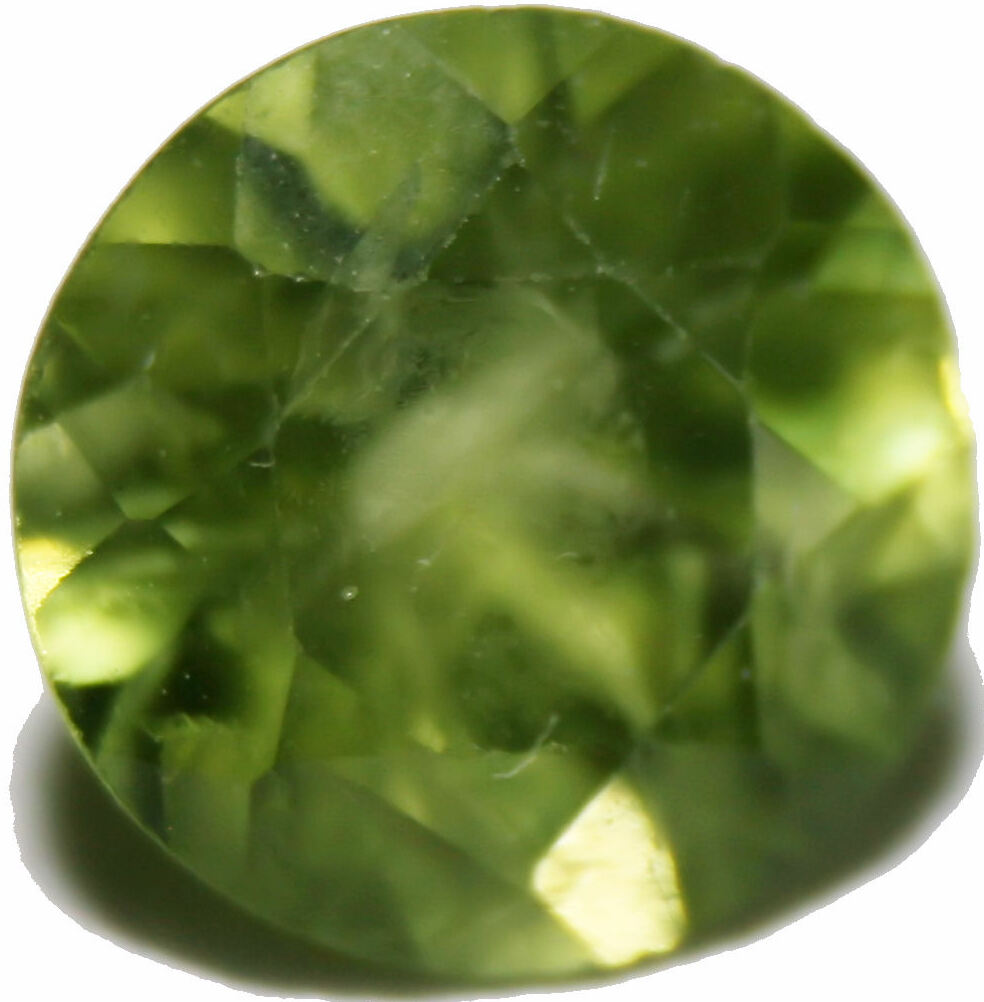
Peridot with milky inclusion

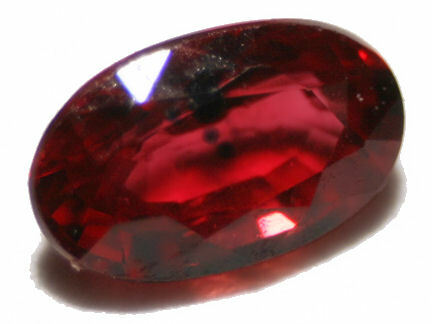
Natural ruby with inclusions

== Metallurgy ==
Inclusions are also found in metallurgy and metals processing. During the melt stage of processing particles such as oxides can enter or form in the liquid metal which are subsequently trapped when the melt solidifies. The term is usually used negatively such as when the particle could act as a fatigue crack nucleator or as an area of high stress intensity.

== See also ==
- Gemstone
- Diamond inclusions
