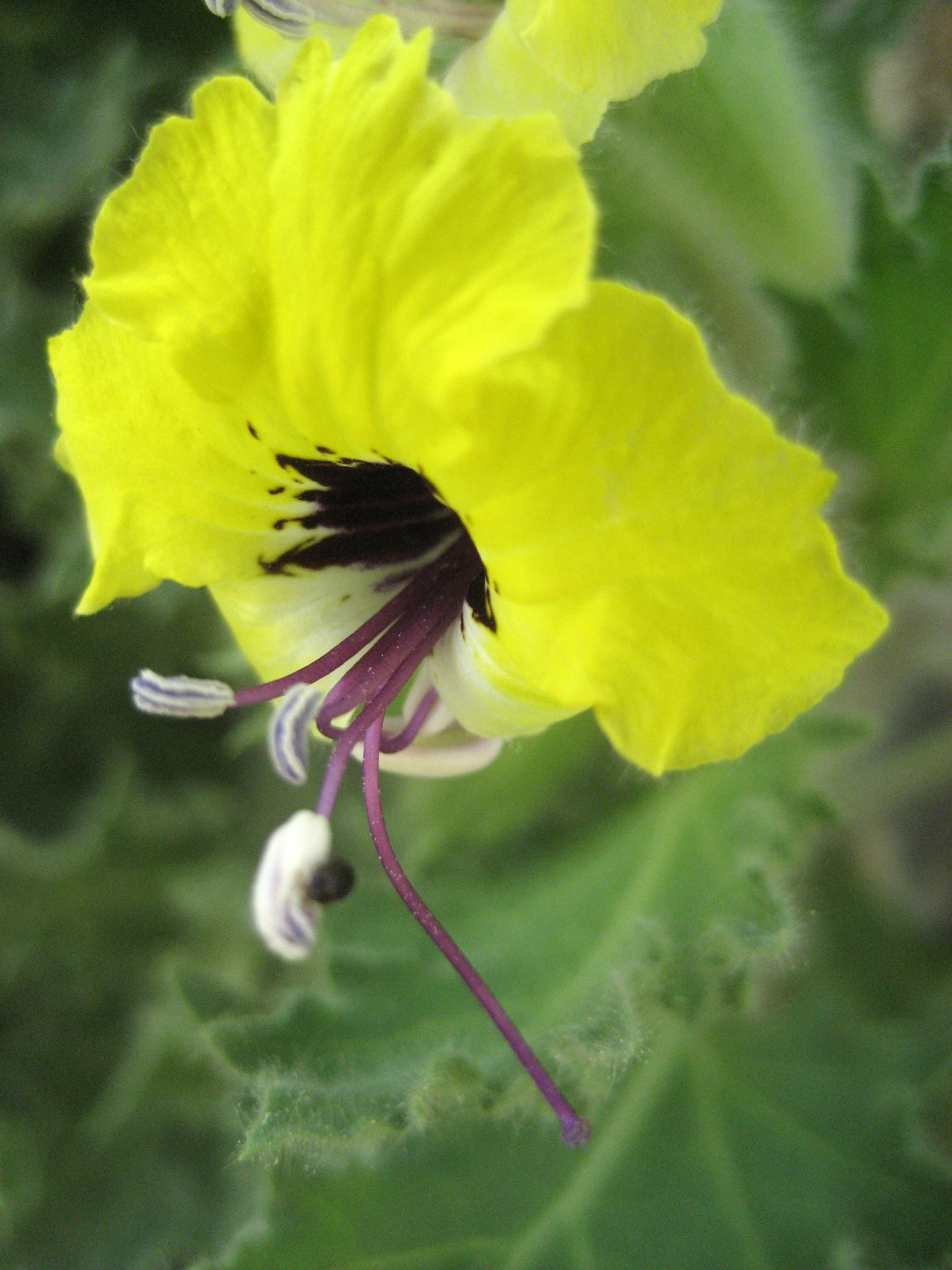

Scientific classification
- Kingdom: Plantae
- Clade: Tracheophytes
- Clade: Angiosperms
- Clade: Eudicots
- Clade: Asterids
- Order: Solanales
- Family: Solanaceae
- Genus: Hyoscyamus
- Species: H. aureus

Binomial name
- Hyoscyamus aureus L.

= Hyoscyamus aureus =

Species of flowering plant

Hyoscyamus aureus, the golden henbane or yellow henbane, is a species of plant in the family Solanaceae native to the Eastern Mediterranean and Iraq.

== Description ==
A very sticky long-haired perennial, often densely sprawling, the flowers are asymmetric (petals are placed in an upper position), golden yellow with purple throat and stamens and style long-protrude. After flowering the inflorescence elongates greatly and on withering small plants may form at their ends. The leaves are roundish to egg-shaped with irregular edges, long stalk (to 3 cm) and variable base.

Similar species include: Hyoscyamus albus (flowers paler yellow, stamens not protruding), Hyoscyamus niger (plants upright, flowers lurid yellow with purple veins and speckles), and Ecballium elaterium (in its early vegetative stages, which has coarse hairs and very prominent net veins under the leaf).

Sources Flora Europaea, Flora of Turkey.

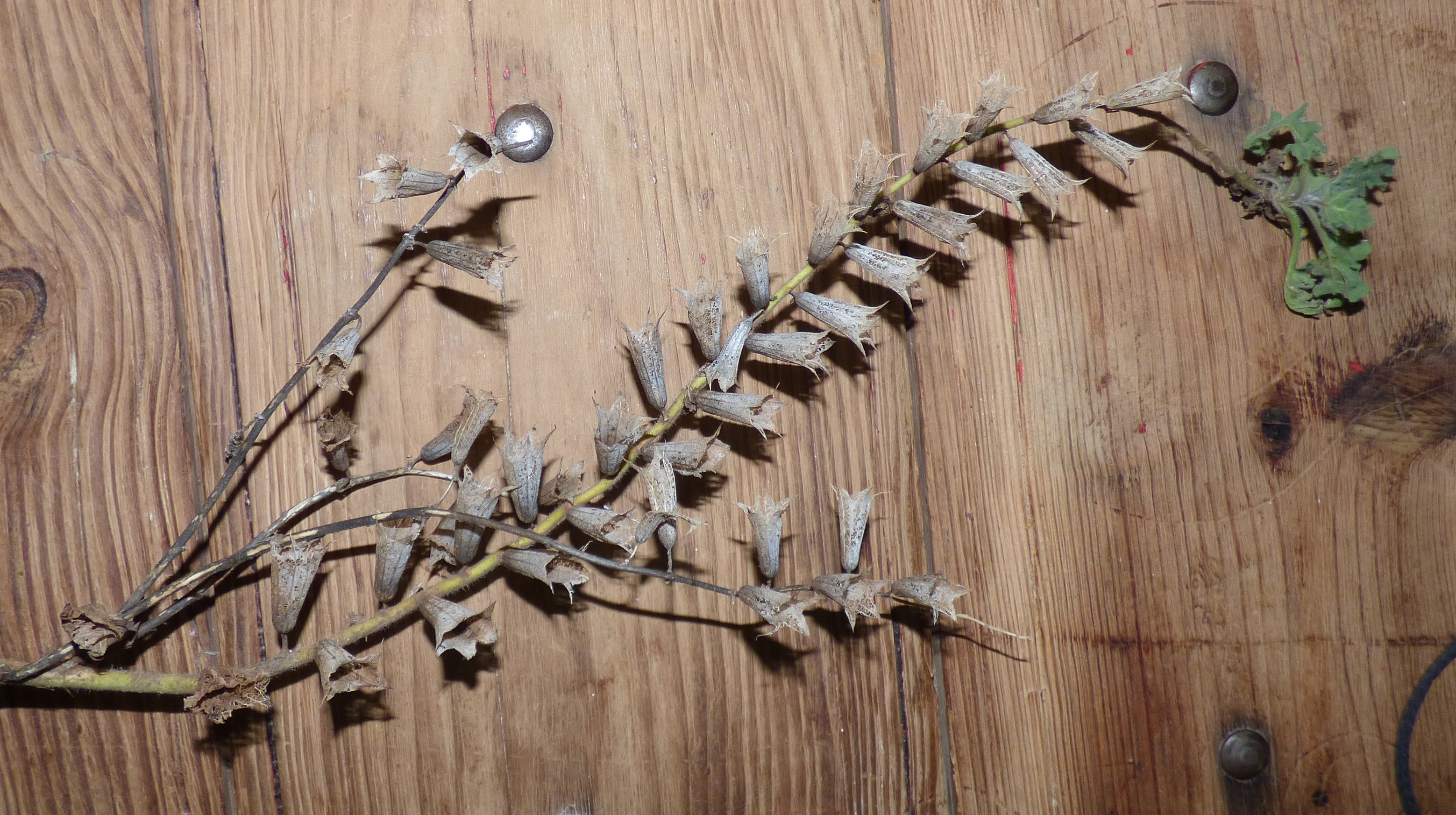
Proliferation from the inflorescence tip

== Habitat ==
Turkey: Rock crevices, old walls, ruins, 0–1200 m.
