= Ernest Ayscoghe Floyer =

English colonial official and explorer

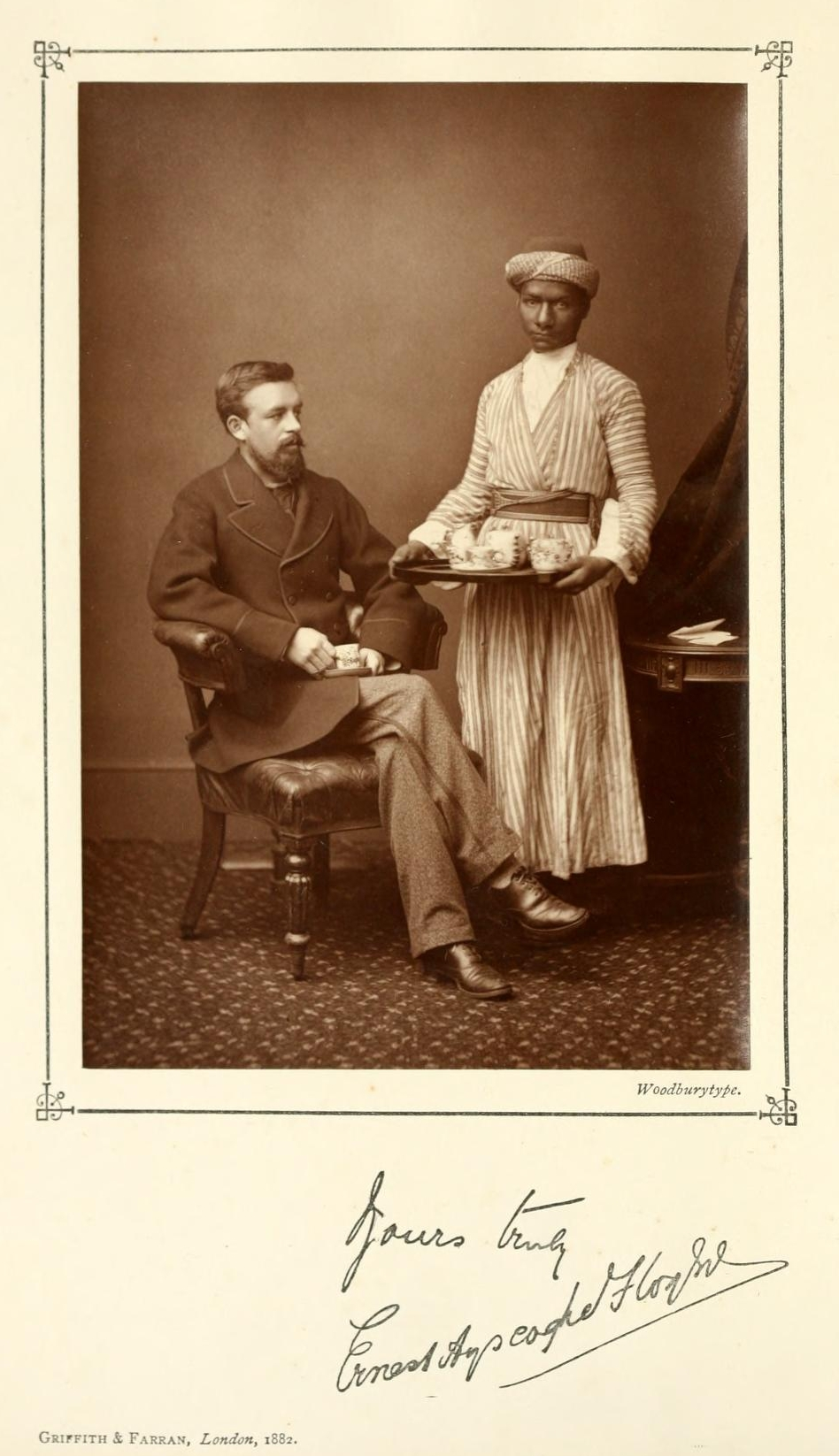
Floyer with a Baluch servant, 1885

Ernest Ayscoghe Floyer (1852–1903) was a British colonial official, and explorer in Baluchistan and the Sudan. He explored the economically useful plants and materials of interest along his travels. He was put in charge of extracting nitrate of soda after discovering a deposit of it in Egypt and later served as inspector general of telegraphs in Egypt.

== Life ==
Born on 4 July 1852 at Marshchapel, Lincolnshire, he was eldest surviving son of the Rev. Ayscoghe Floyer (d. 1872) and his wife Louisa Sara Floyer (1830–1909), daughter of the Hon. Frederic John Shore of the Bengal Civil Service, and granddaughter of John Shore, 1st Baron Teignmouth, and writer on needlework. Educated at Reverend C. Boys at Wing Rectory, Rutland, and then Charterhouse School from 1865 until 1869, he served for seven years in the Indian telegraph service, stationed on the coast of the Persian Gulf.

On a long leave, in January 1876, Floyer started for the unexplored interior of what is now Sistan and Baluchestan province, in Iran. He travelled there him until May 1877, and earned himself a reputation as an explorer. In January 1878 he was appointed inspector-general of Egyptian telegraphs, a post which he held for the rest of his life. He turned round the finances of the department, and induced the government to devote a part of its surplus to experiments on the cultivation of trees and plants in the desert. He cultivated successfully cactus for fibre, Casuarina for telegraph poles, Hyoscyamus muticus yielding the alkaloid hyoscyamine, and other plants. Having discovered sodium nitrate in a clay in Upper Egypt, he was appointed by the government to superintend the process of its extraction.

In 1884 Floyer made a journey in the Sudan, from Wadi Halfa to Al Dabbah; and in 1887 surveyed two routes between the River Nile and the Red Sea at about latitude 26°. In 1891 he was appointed by the Khedive of Egypt to the command of an expedition in a more southerly part of the same desert (about latitude 24°). On this expedition he rediscovered the abandoned Sikait-Zubara (Mons Smaragdus) emerald mines, which were then reopened.

For services to the military authorities Floyer received the Egypt Medal with clasp, and the Khedive's Star. He had mastered of Arabic including dialects. He died at Cairo on 1 December 1903.

== Works ==
Unexplored Baluchistan (1882) describes: Floyer's journey of exploration from Jask to Bampur; a tour in the Persian Gulf; and a journey of exploration from Jask to Kerman via Angohran. There are appendices on dialects of Western Baluchistan and on plants collected.

Floyer described his Egyptian explorations in: The Mines of the Northern Etbai; Notes on the Geology of the Northern Etbai; Further Routes in the Eastern Desert of Egypt; and Journeys in the Eastern Desert of Egypt. His official publication was Étude sur la Nord-Etbai entre le Nil and la Mer Rouge (Cairo, 1893). He contributed papers on antiquarian, botanical, and agricultural matters to the Journal of the Institut Egyptien for 1894–6.

== Family ==
Floyer married in 1887 Mary Louisa, eldest daughter of the Rev. William Richards Watson, rector of Saltfleetby St. Peter, Lincolnshire. They had three sons.
