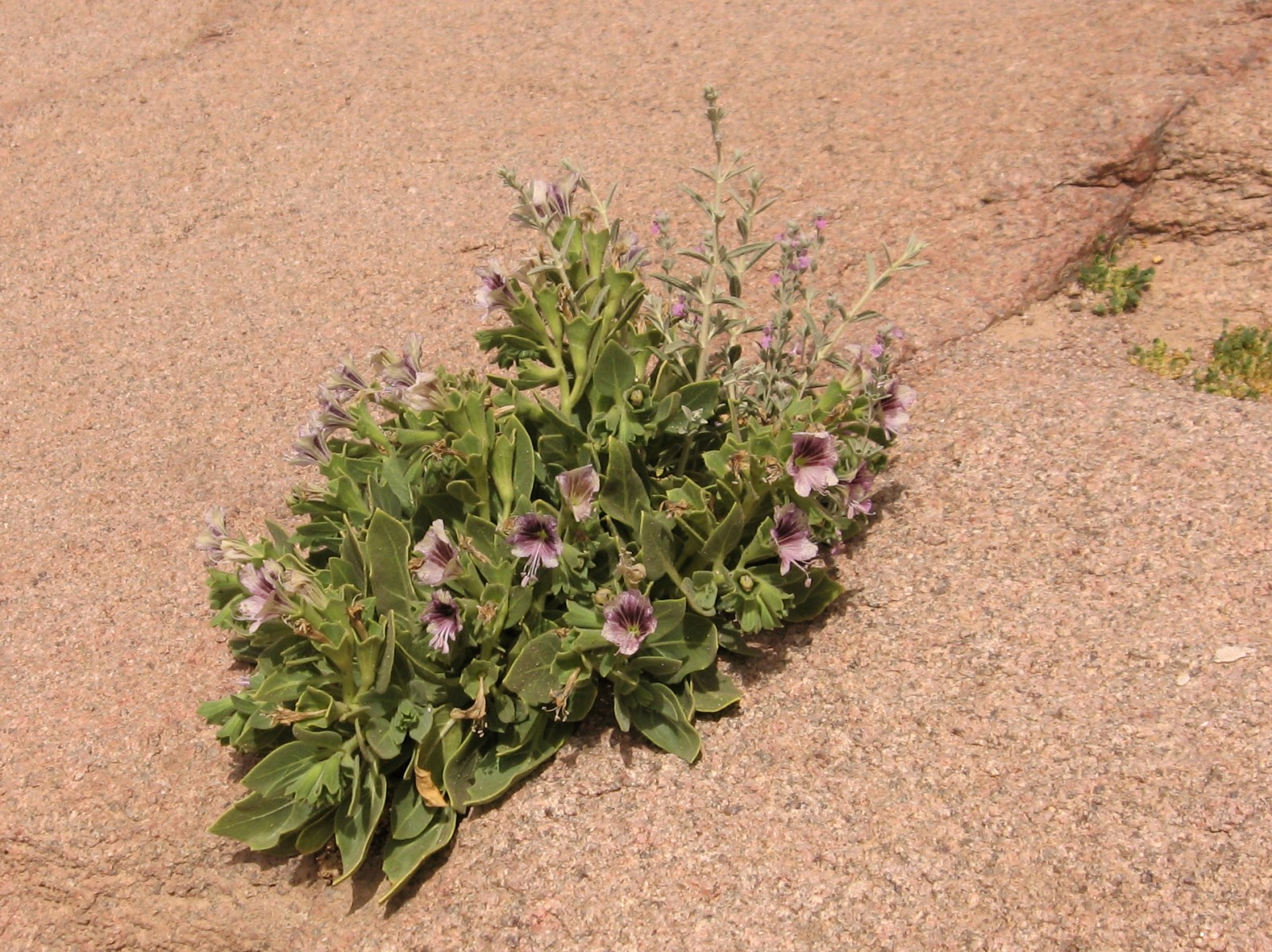

Scientific classification
- Kingdom: Plantae
- Clade: Tracheophytes
- Clade: Angiosperms
- Clade: Eudicots
- Clade: Asterids
- Order: Solanales
- Family: Solanaceae
- Genus: Hyoscyamus
- Species: H. muticus

Binomial name
- Hyoscyamus muticus L.

Synonyms
- Hyoscyamus falezlez

= Hyoscyamus muticus =

Species of flowering plant

Hyoscyamus muticus, the Egyptian henbane, is a shrub in the family of Solanaceae that is native to desert areas of North Africa. It contains alkaloids that are useful in pharmaceuticals. It is used locally as a painkiller and a recreational drug. In high dosages it can be fatal.

== General ==
Hyoscyamus muticus, commonly known as Egyptian henbane, is native to Sub-Saharan Africa from Mauritania to Sudan and is also found in Saudi Arabia and the eastern Mediterranean. It grows in arid rocky localities, wadis and plains. The wild plants are used in traditional local medicine. It is sometimes cultivated in countries such as Egypt, Pakistan and India for its medicinal alkaloids, which may be exported to countries such as Germany. Ernest Ayscoghe Floyer (1852–1903) successfully cultivated Hyoscyamus muticus to obtain the alkaloid hyoscyamine.

== Description ==
Egyptian henbane is a perennial herb or shrub with a height of up to 1.5 metres (4 ft 11 in). It is a stout succulent, with long stems that have many branches in their upper parts. The lower leaves are broad, while the upper leaves are narrower. The flowers are formed in dense inflorescences up to 30 centimetres (12 in) long. They have white or green corolla and upper lips in deep purple-violet. The fruit is a capsule.

== Medical effects ==
The leaves are high in alkaloids including scopolamine, which is used in pharmaceuticals. When released slowly, scopolamine reduces the nausea of motion sickness or post-operative recovery. In eye drops it dilates the pupils and paralyzes the focusing muscles, which is useful in optical surgery. The roasted seeds are used to make an intoxicating drink, and the leaves are smoked for their intoxicating effect, and to relieve the symptoms of asthma. The leaves may also be applied as a poultice to relieve pain.

The plant is toxic in higher doses, and deaths have been reported from eating locusts that had eaten Egyptian henbane. The Tuareg people use it as a fish poison. An overdose causes symptoms such as an extremely dry throat, constipation, a rapid pulse, blurred vision, excitement, hallucinations, delirium and death. The wives of the Roman emperors Augustus and Claudius used the plant as a poison to eliminate rivals. In February 1881 the survivors of the Flatters Expedition were approached by a group of Tuaregs who sold them milk, meat and dates at a high price. The dates turned out to be poisoned with a substance that caused dizziness and psychosis. This came from the plant called Falezlez by the Tuaregs and El Bettina by the Arabs (Hyoscyamus falezlez). The effect was to induce a burning sensation in the victims' lungs, and to cause them to rush about madly and fire off their guns.

== Sources ==
- Brower, Benjamin Claude (2011), A Desert Named Peace: The Violence of France's Empire in the Algerian Sahara, 1844–1902, Columbia University Press, ISBN 978-0-231-15493-2
- Cornish, Vaughan (1912). "Floyer, Ernest Ayscoghe" . Dictionary of National Biography (2nd supplement). Vol. 2. pp. 36–37.
- Fern, Ken (2014), "Hyoscyamus muticus", Useful Tropical Plants Database
- "Hyoscyamus muticus", EOL: Encyclopedia of Life
- Ney, Napoleon (1891), "The Proposed Trans-Saharian Railway", Scribner's Magazine, Charles Scribner's Sons
- Wilkinson, Gordon (9 April 2011), "Sakaran سكران", Wilderness Ventures Egypt, archived from the original on 2021-01-19
