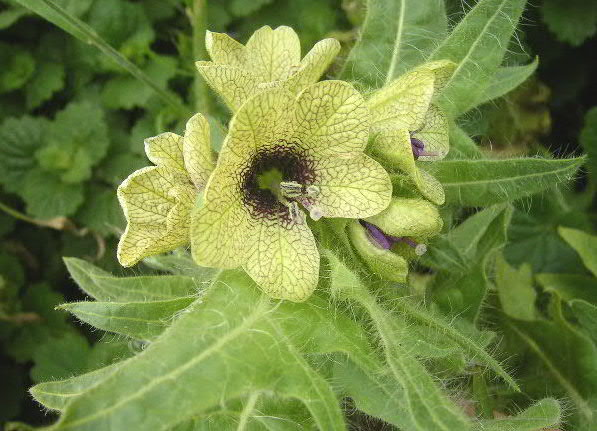
- Hyoscyamus niger

Scientific classification
- Kingdom: Plantae
- Clade: Tracheophytes
- Clade: Angiosperms
- Clade: Eudicots
- Clade: Asterids
- Order: Solanales
- Family: Solanaceae
- Subfamily: Solanoideae
- Tribe: Hyoscyameae
- Genus: Hyoscyamus; L. (1753)

Species
- 31, see text

Synonyms
- Archihyoscyamus A.M.Lu (1997); Hyoscarpus Dulac (1867)

= Hyoscyamus =

Genus of flowering plants

Hyoscyamus — known as the henbanes — is a genus of flowering plants in the nightshade family, Solanaceae. It comprises 31 species, all of which are toxic. It, along with other genera in the same family, is a source of the drug hyoscyamine (daturine). Cruciferous type of stomata are present in Hyoscyamus.

Hyoscyamus means "hog-bean" in botanical Latin and was a name derogatorily applied to the plant by Dioscorides.

The poisonous, narcotic henbanes were associated with witchcraft since earliest times. The Assyrians recommended hanging them on one's door to ward off sorcery. Witches found them valuable especially due to their trance-inducing capabilities, and they were used in flying ointment rituals. They have been used to lessen pain, neuralgia and diminish convulsions. Dioscorides recommended them largely for external pain killing use. The leaves are made into a kind of cigarette to relieve asthma and other respiratory ailments.

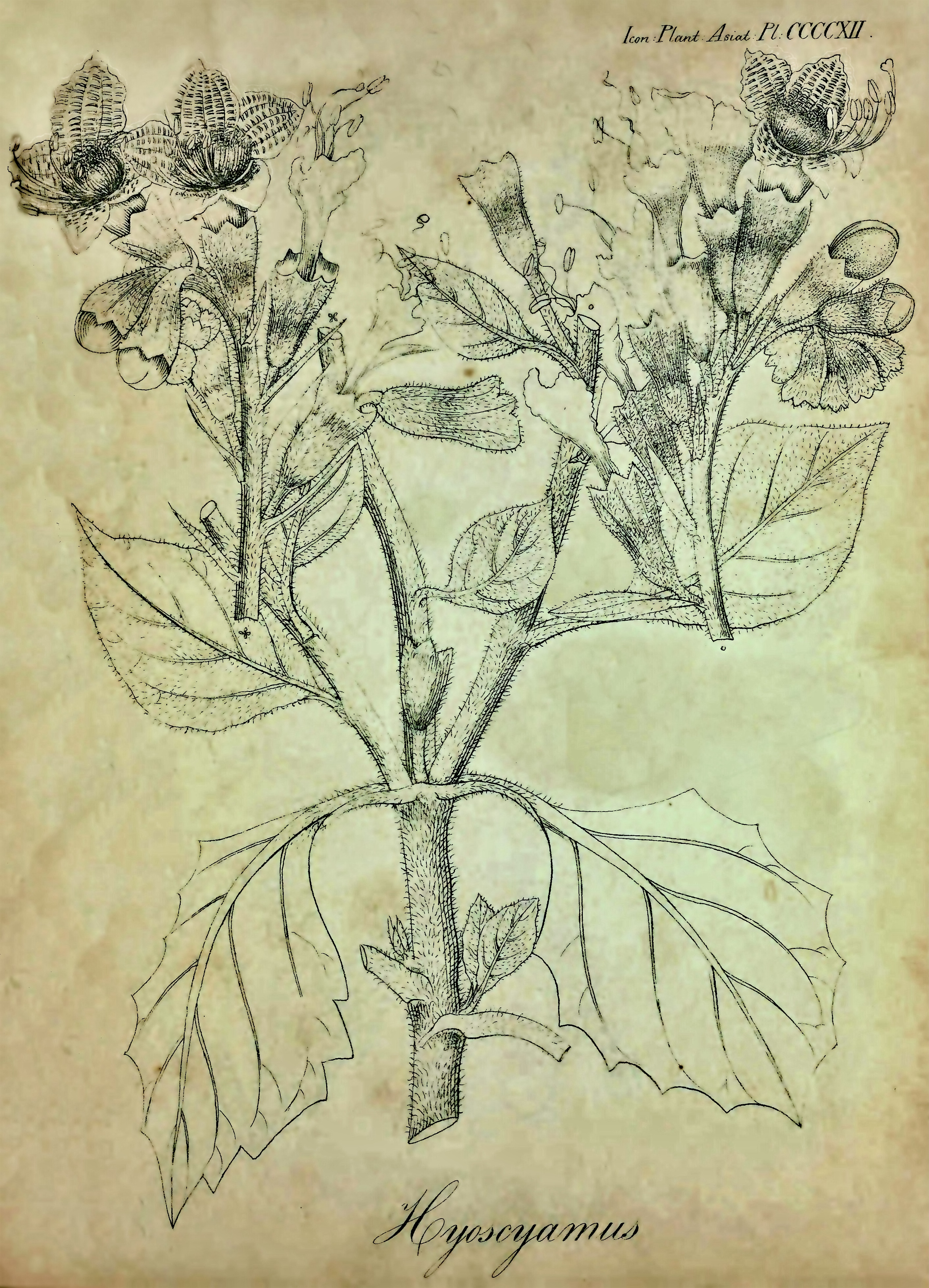
Hyoscyamus insanus, from Griffith, W., Icones plantarum asiaticarum, 1854

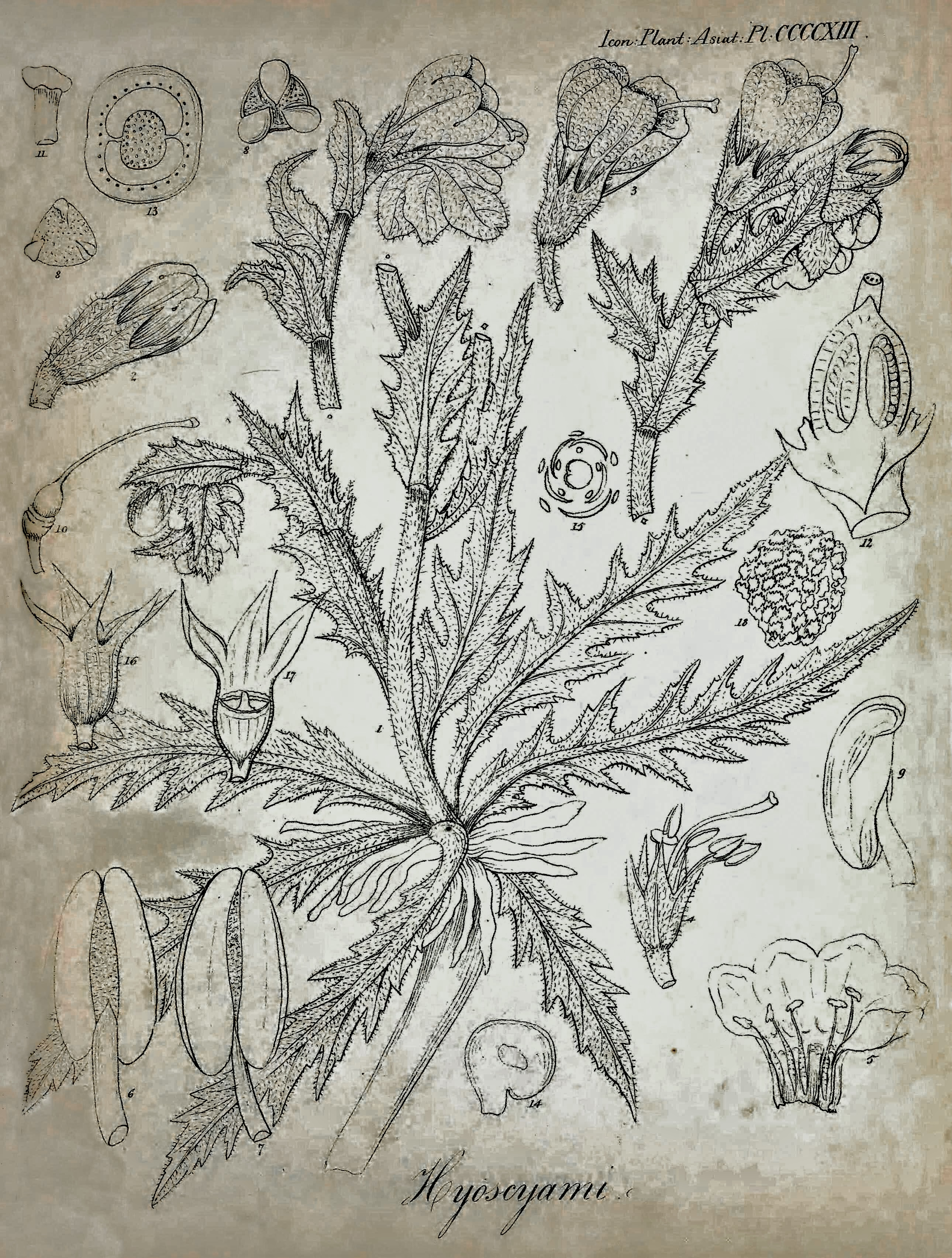
Hyoscyamus squarrosus, likewise from Griffith, W., Icones plantarum asiaticarum, 1854

== Species ==
31 species are accepted.

- Hyoscyamus afghanicus Pojark. – Afghanistan
- Hyoscyamus albus L. – White henbane – Spain and Morocco
- Hyoscyamus arachnoideus Pojark. – northern Iraq and Western Iran
- Hyoscyamus aureus L. – Golden henbane – Eastern Mediterranean (Greece to Egypt) and Iraq
- Hyoscyamus bornmuelleri Khat. – southern Iran
- Hyoscyamus boveanus (Dunal) Asch. & Schweinf. – Egypt and Sinai
- Hyoscyamus coelesyriacus Bornm. – Lebanon
- Hyoscyamus desertorum (Asch. ex Boiss.) Täckh. – Syria to Egypt and northeastern Saudi Arabia
- Hyoscyamus flaccidus C.Wright – Oman and Yemen
- Hyoscyamus gallagheri A.G.Mill. & Biagi – Oman
- Hyoscyamus grandiflorus Franch. – northern Somalia
- Hyoscyamus insanus Stocks – eastern Arabian Peninsula to Iran, Afghanistan, Pakistan, and the Himalayas
- Hyoscyamus kotschyanus Pojark. – western and southwestern Iran
- Hyoscyamus kurdicus Bornm. – northern Iraq to Iran
- Hyoscyamus leptocalyx Stapf – southeastern Turkey to western Iran
- Hyoscyamus leucanthera Bornm. & Gauba – Iran, Afghanistan, and Turkmenistan
- Hyoscyamus longipedunculatus C.C.Towns. – northern Iraq
- Hyoscyamus malekianus Parsa – southern Iran
- Hyoscyamus multicaulis Rech.f. & Edelb. – central Afghanistan
- Hyoscyamus muticus L. (synonym: H. falezlez) – Egyptian henbane – northern Africa (Sahara), Arabian Peninsula, Iran, Pakistan, and India
- Hyoscyamus niger L. – Black henbane – temperate Eurasia and north Africa
- Hyoscyamus nutans Schönb.-Tem. – Iran
- Hyoscyamus orthocarpus Schönb.-Tem. – western and southern Iran
- Hyoscyamus pojarkovae Schönb.-Tem. – Syria, Iraq, and Iran
- Hyoscyamus pusillus L. – Western and Central Asia to Tibet and Mongolia
- Hyoscyamus reticulatus L. – Turkey to Sinai and Tajikistan
- Hyoscyamus rosularis Schönb.-Tem. – central Iran
- Hyoscyamus senecionis Willd. – northern Iraq, Iran, and Afghanistan
- Hyoscyamus squarrosus Griff. – Iran, Turkmenistan, Afghanistan, and Pakistan
- Hyoscyamus tenuicaulis Schönb.-Tem. – western and southern Iran
- Hyoscyamus tibesticus Maire – Chad (Tibesti Mountains)

== Gallery ==
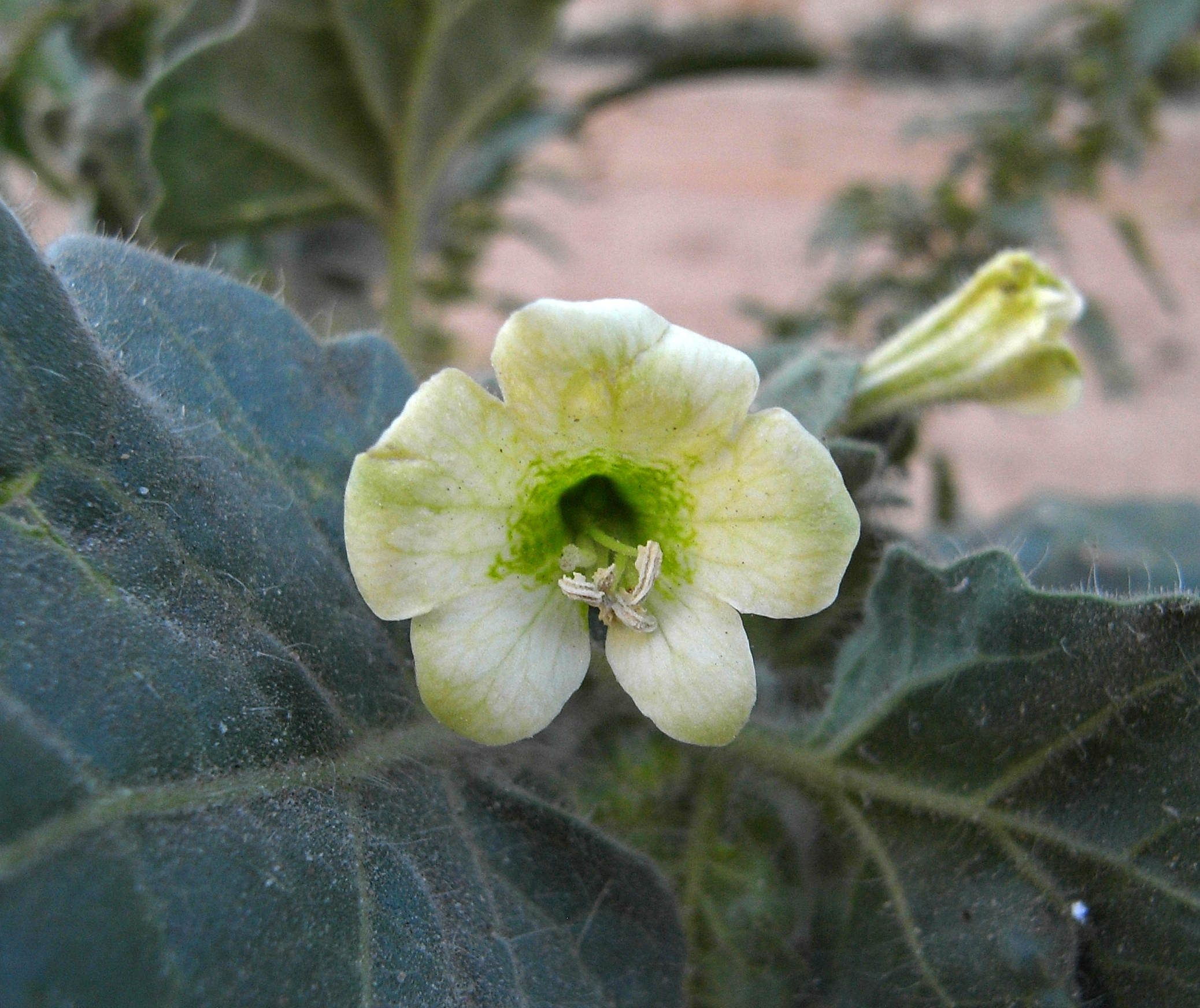
Hyoscyamus albus

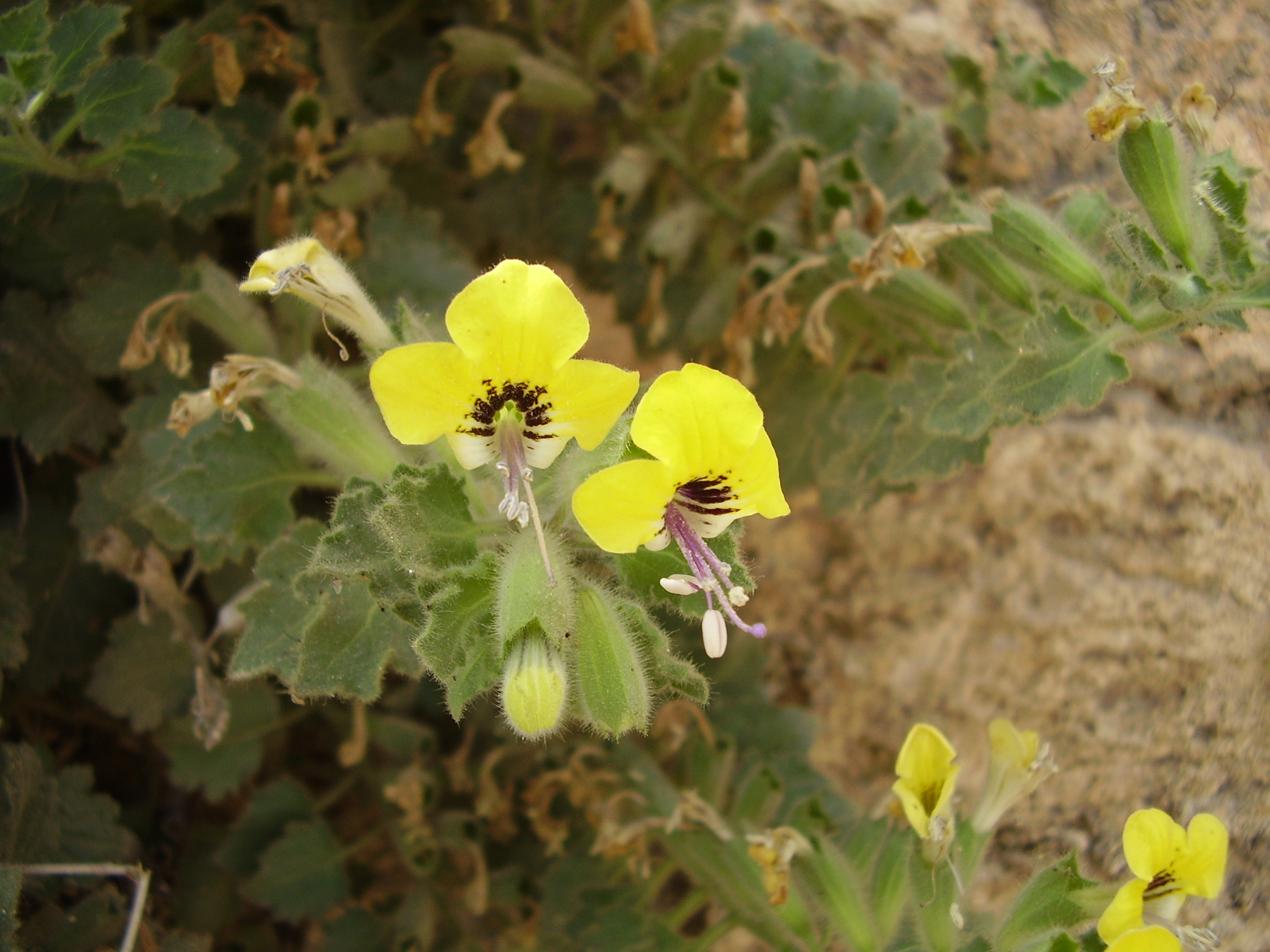
Hyoscyamus aureus

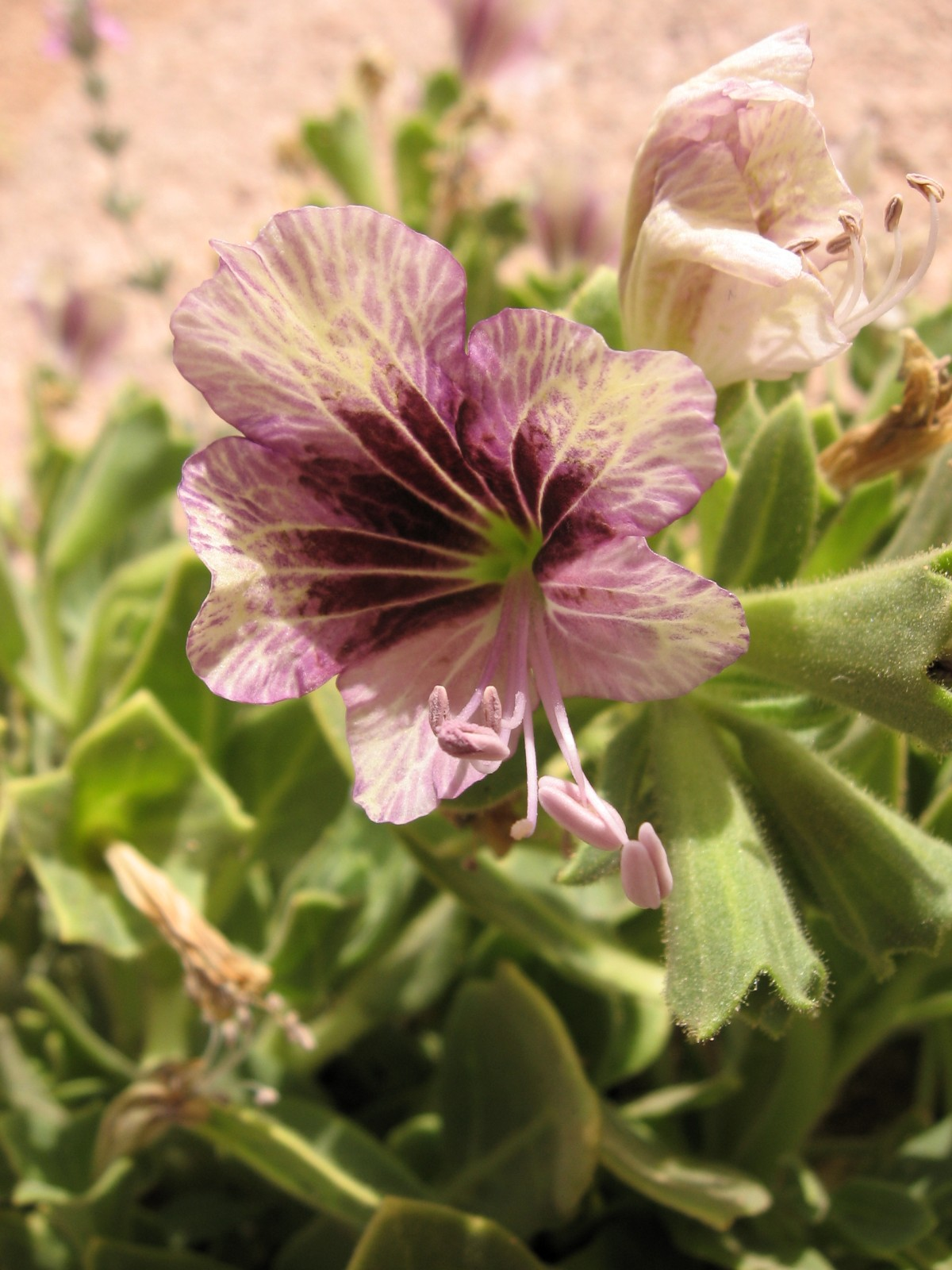
Hyoscyamus muticus

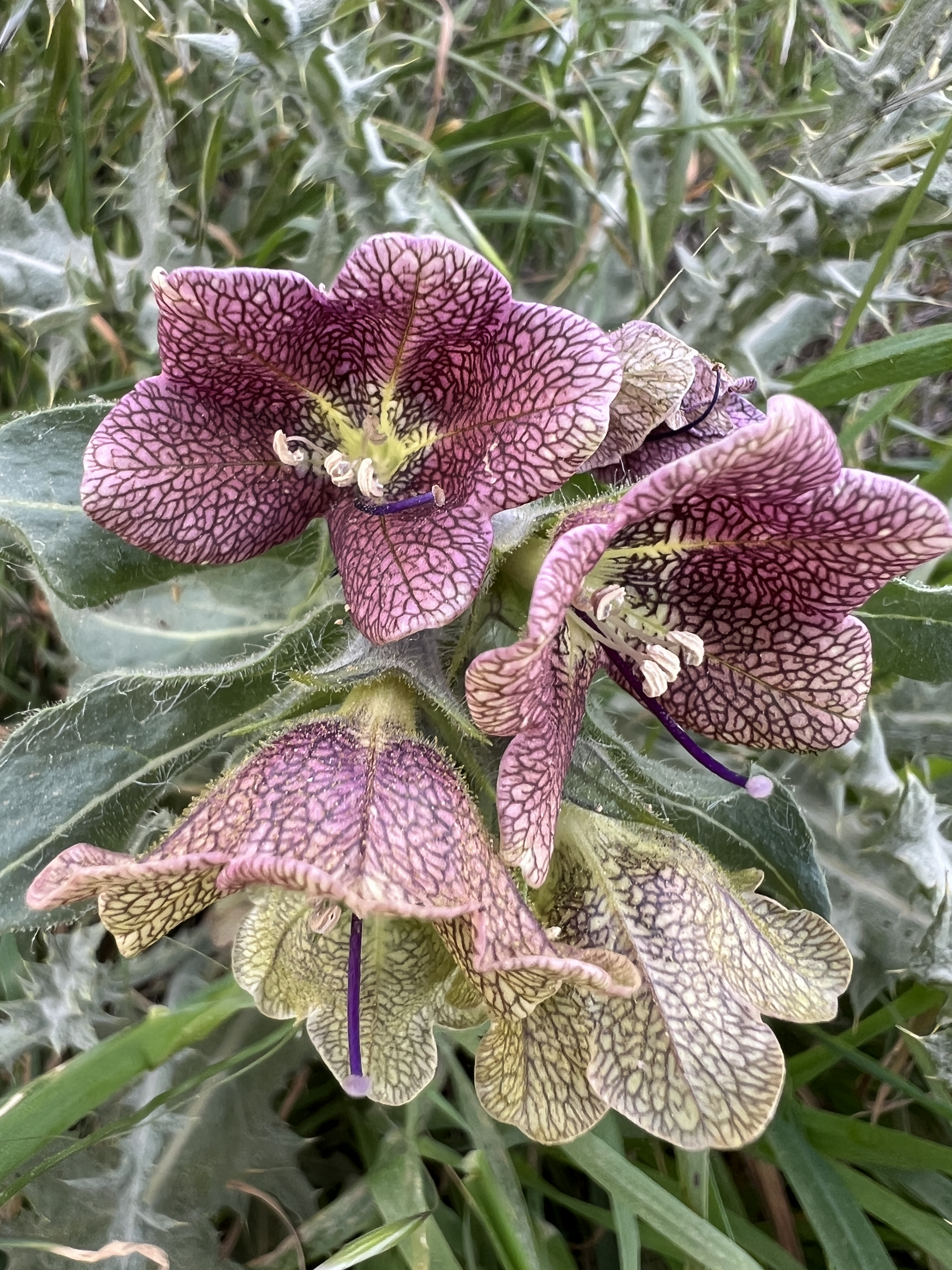
Hyoscyamus reticulatus

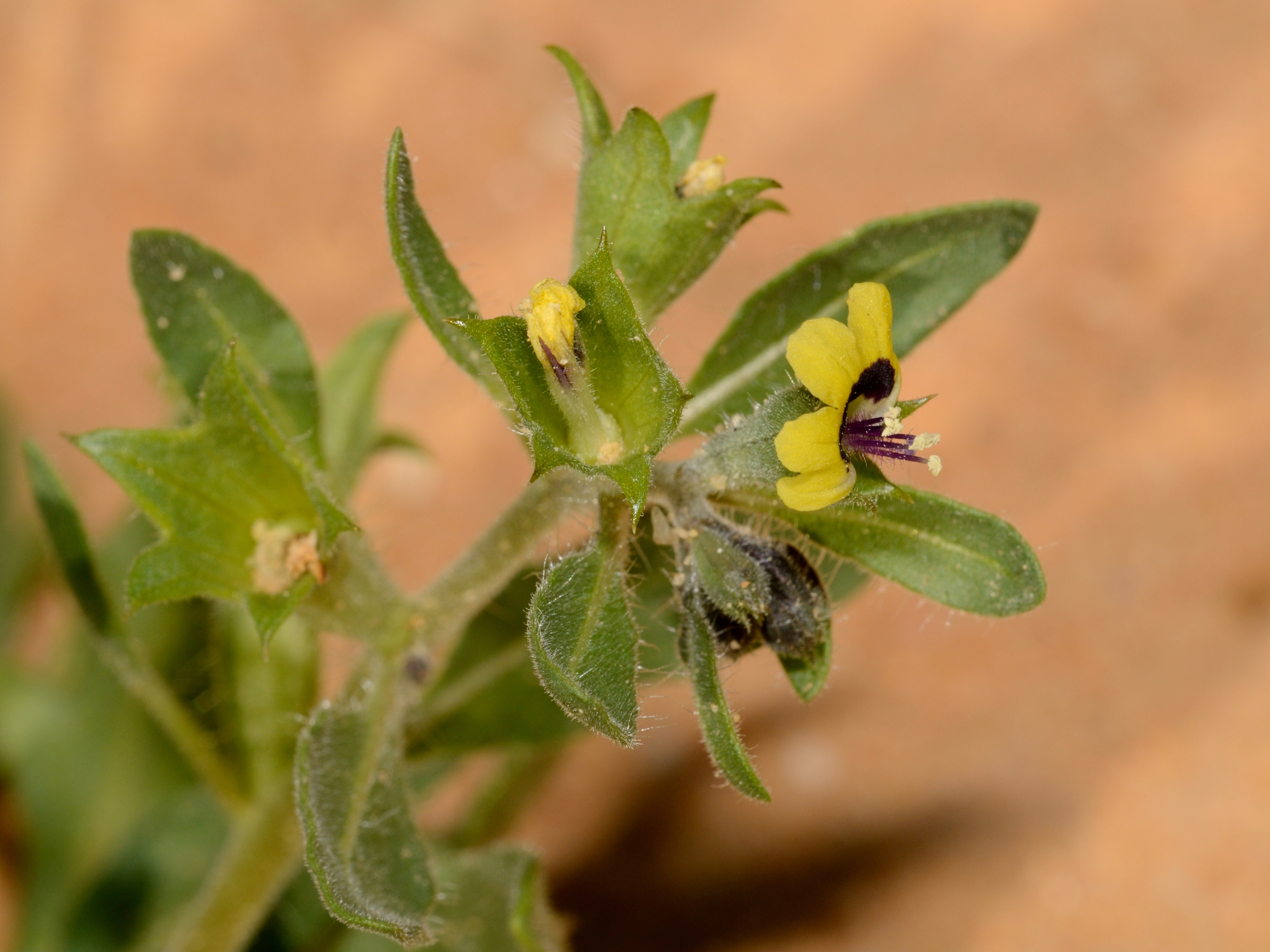
Hyoscyamus pusillus
