= Hebenon =

Poisonous botanical substance mentioned in Hamlet

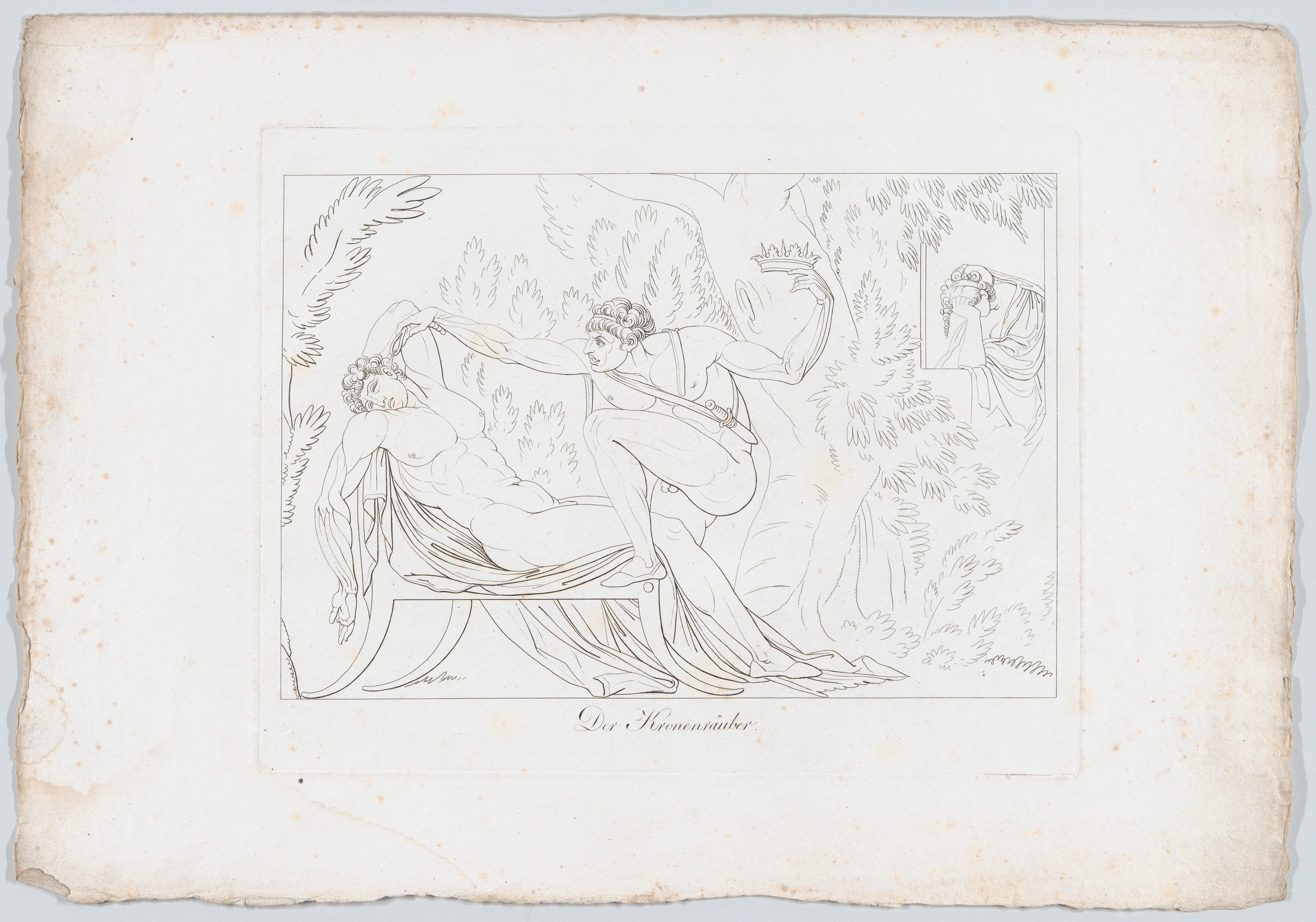
Der Kronenräuber ("The Crown Thief": Claudio [sic] Murders His Brother, King Hamlet, By Pouring Poison into His Ear as He Lies Sleeping in the Garden) (Johann Heinrich Lips and Henry Fuseli, 1806)

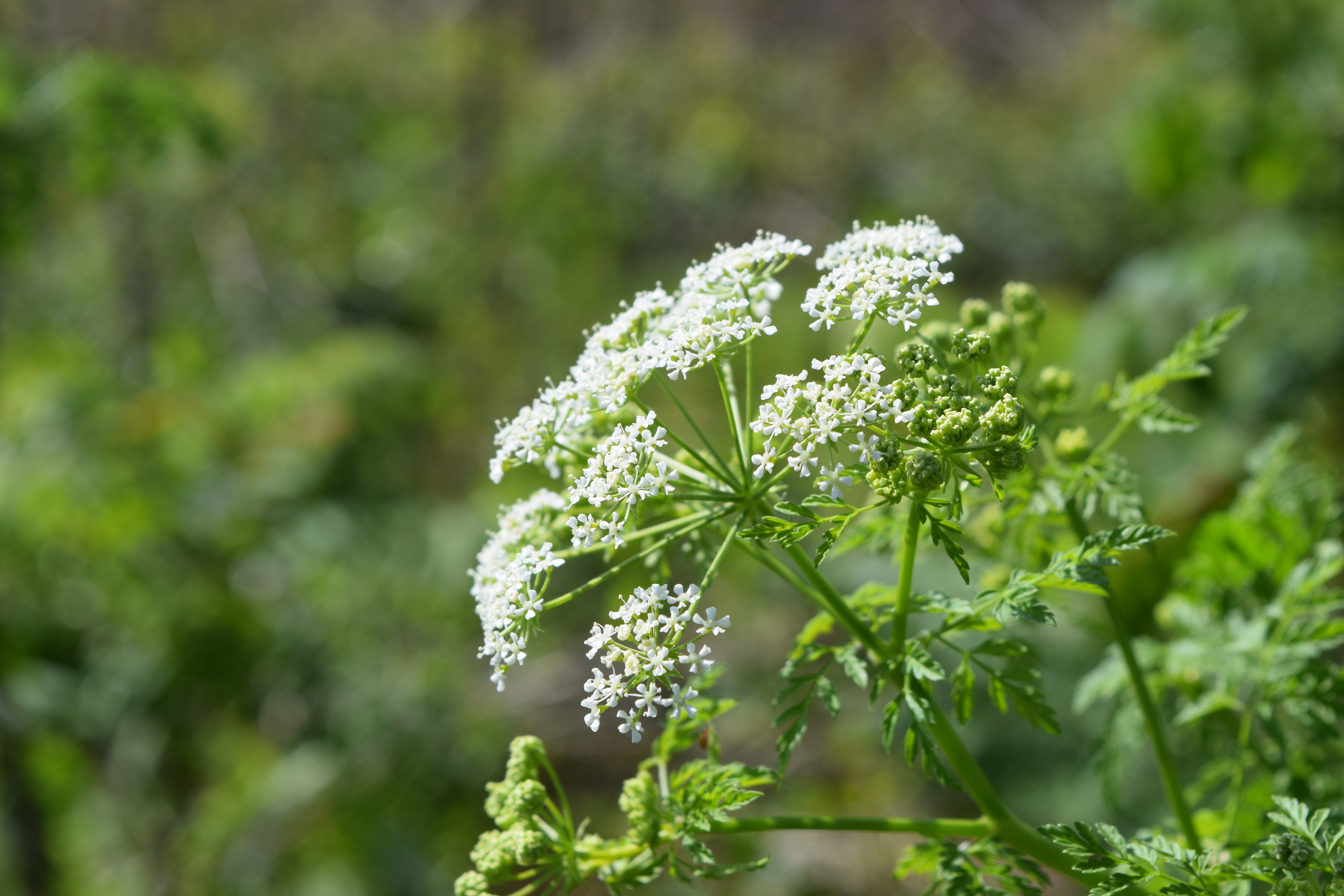
Poison hemlock

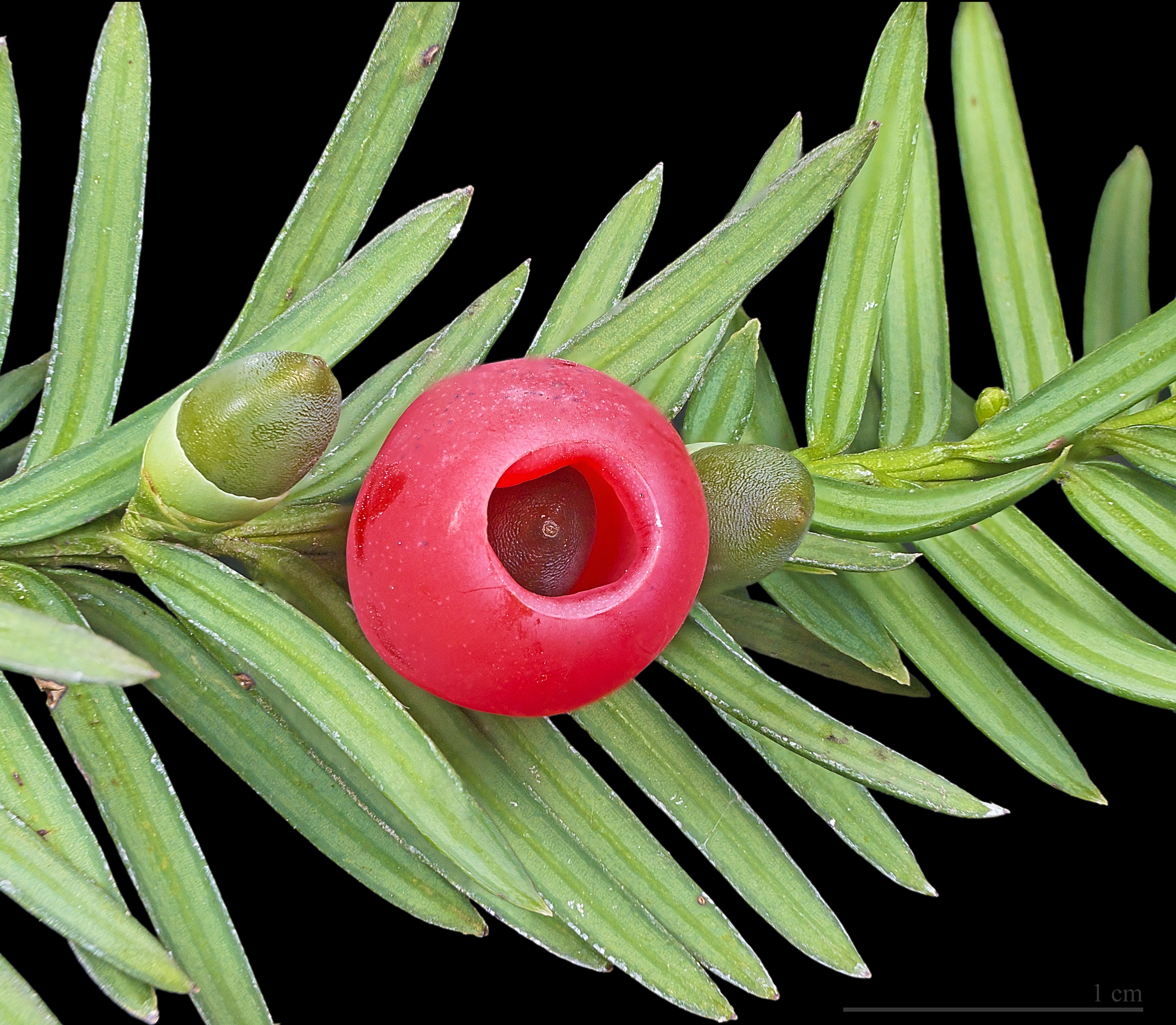
Yew

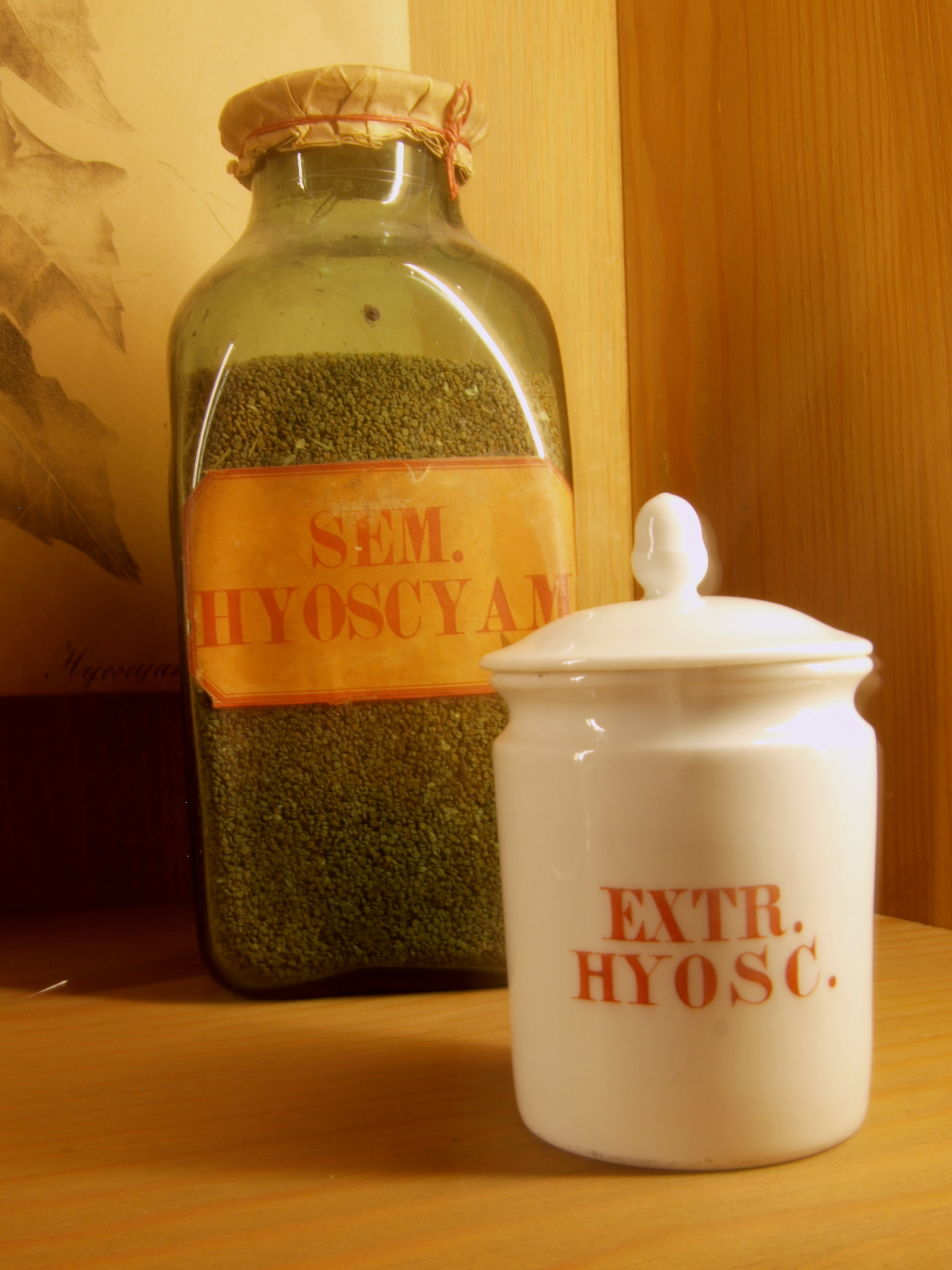
Henbane

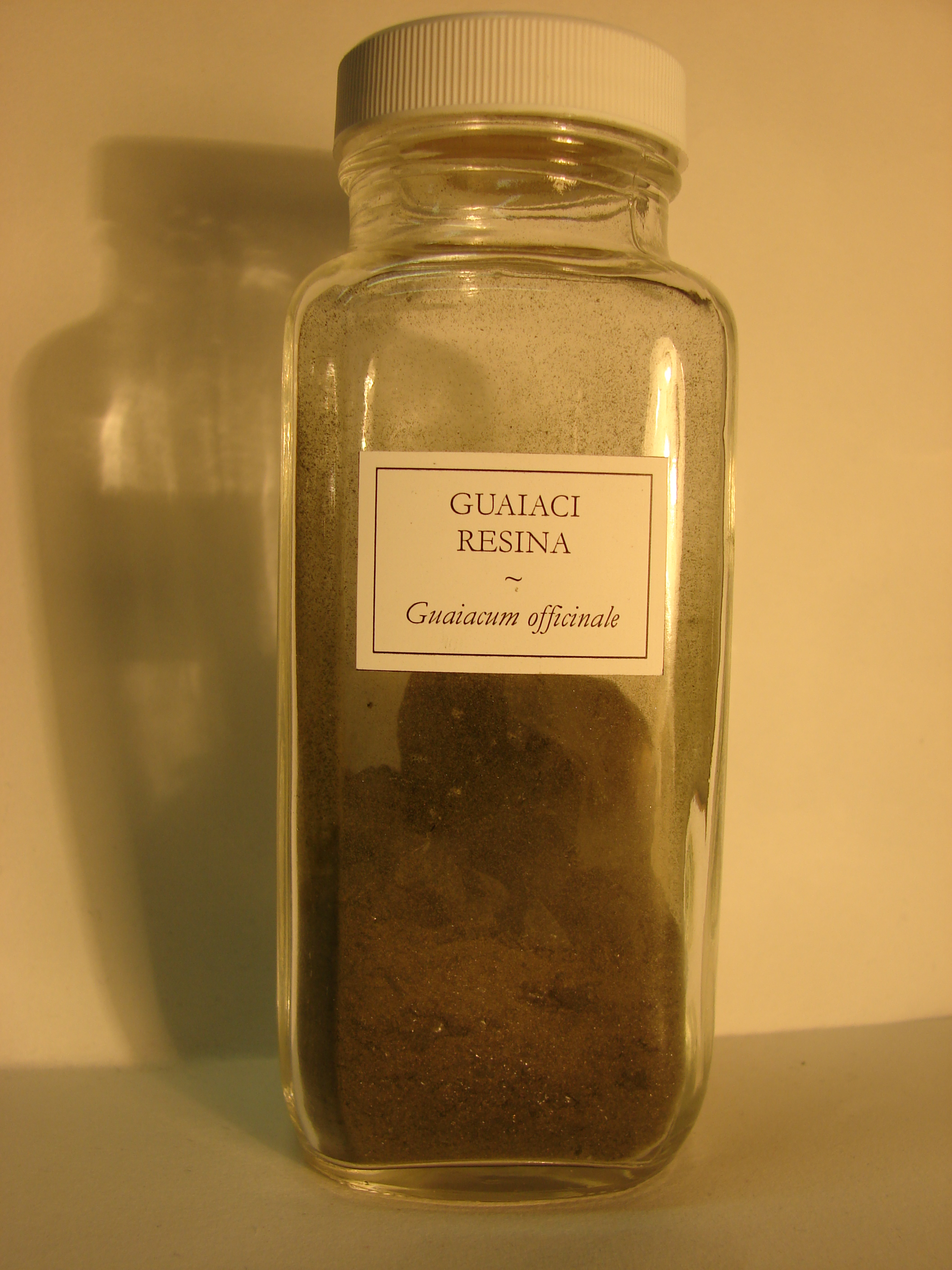
Guaiac

Possible candidates for hebenon

Hebenon (or hebona) is a botanical substance described in William Shakespeare's tragic play Hamlet. The identity and nature of the poison has been a source of speculation for centuries.

== Shakespeare's usage ==
Hebenon is the agent of death in Hamlet's father's murder; it sets in motion the events of the play. It is spelled hebona in the Quartos and hebenon in the Folios. This is the only mention of hebona or hebenon in any of Shakespeare’s plays.

Upon my secure hour thy uncle stole,
With juice of cursed hebenon in a vial,
And in the porches of my ears did pour
The leperous distilment; whose effect
Holds such an enmity with blood of man
That, swift as quicksilver, it courses through
The natural gates and alleys of the body;
And with a sudden vigour it doth posset
And curd, like eager droppings into milk,
The thin and wholesome blood; so did it mine;
And a most instant tetter bark'd about,
Most lazar-like, with vile and loathsome crust
All my smooth body.
Thus was I, sleeping, by a brother's hand,
Of life, of crown, of queen, at once dispatch'd:

—Ghost of Hamlet's Father, spoken to Hamlet

[Act I, scene 5]

== Identity of the poison ==
Writers from Shakespeare's time to the present have speculated about the identity of hebenon.

It may be different from hemlock, as hemlock is explicitly mentioned in several other writings of his (including King Lear, Macbeth, and Henry V). In favour of it being yew are the familiarity of yew as a poison and the similarity in symptoms. Edmund Spenser wrote of "the deadly heben bow" ("heben" being a word for ebony, from Latin hebenus). In favour of ebony (specifically, guaiac) is the fact that ebony was sometimes written with an h, but arguing against it is the low toxicity of guaiac. Other authors question whether there is sufficient evidence to resolve the issue, or even whether Shakespeare's attention to botany and pharmacology was sufficient to say he meant a specific plant. John Updike's retelling in the novel Gertrude and Claudius identifies the poison as "the juice of hebona," which "combines the essences of yew and henbane, with other ingredients inimical to the blood's humors."
