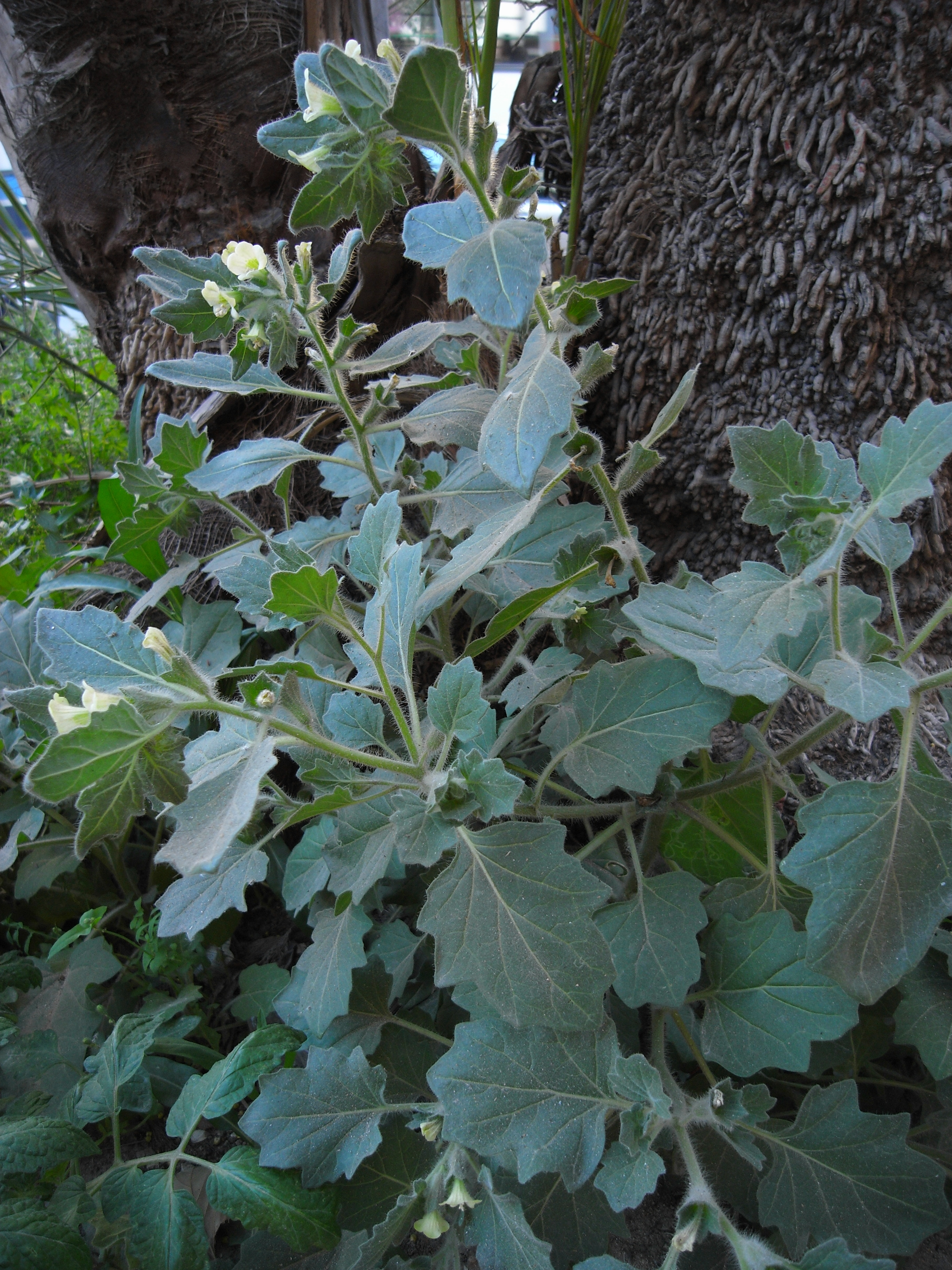

Scientific classification
- Kingdom: Plantae
- Clade: Tracheophytes
- Clade: Angiosperms
- Clade: Eudicots
- Clade: Asterids
- Order: Solanales
- Family: Solanaceae
- Genus: Hyoscyamus
- Species: H. albus

Binomial name
- Hyoscyamus albus L.

= Hyoscyamus albus =

Species of flowering plant

Hyoscyamus albus, the white henbane or yellow henbane, is a plant in the family of Solanaceae. It is native to Southern Europe, North Africa, West Asia and Macaronesia.

== Description ==
Erect plant 20–80 cm tall, sticky and covered with glandular-woolly hairs. All leaves stalked, ovate, bluntly sinuately toothed, Flowers 3 cm across, only the lowest ones stalked, in dense, leafy spike-like inflorescences, the flowers mostly facing the same way. Corolla tubular to bell-shaped, almost regular, with 5 lobes, glandular hairy outside, usually yellowish white, the throat green or purple. Anthers not or only slightly protruding. Calyx densely glandular-woolly 2–2.5 cm long at fruiting-time. Slightly poisonous plant. Flowers March to September. Waste ground, road sides, on walls, often near and in settlements, villages, towns, ancient sites. Mediterranean region, Canary Islands, eastwards to S. Russia and Iraq.

== Medicinal use ==
In the mythological tradition the discovery of the hallucinogenic properties of white henbane (Hyoscyamus albus) has been attributed to the Greek divine hero Heracles. Doctors of the Hippocratic school of medicine gave an infusion of the seeds in wine in cases of fever, tetanus and female disorders, for example where paralysis occurred after childbirth, Dioscorides used both seed and leaves pounded and soaked with hot water to deaden pain and preferred white henbane (Hyoscyamus albus) to other species more likely to cause madness and induce sleep.
