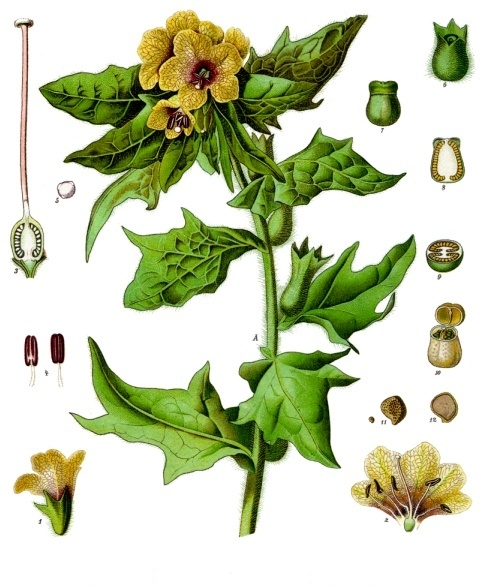
- Hyoscyamus niger in Köhler's Medicinal Plants, 1887

Scientific classification
- Kingdom: Plantae
- Clade: Tracheophytes
- Clade: Angiosperms
- Clade: Eudicots
- Clade: Asterids
- Order: Solanales
- Family: Solanaceae
- Genus: Hyoscyamus
- Species: H. niger

Binomial name
- Hyoscyamus niger L.

= Hyoscyamus niger =

Species of plant

Henbane (Hyoscyamus niger, also black henbane and stinking nightshade) is a poisonous plant belonging to tribe Hyoscyameae of the nightshade family Solanaceae. Henbane is native to temperate Europe and Siberia, and naturalised in Great Britain and Ireland.

== Historical use ==
The name henbane dates from AD 1265; "bane" meant 'thing that causes death'. Other etymologies of henbane derive from the Indo-European stem bhelena meaning "crazy plant" and with the Proto-Germanic element *bil- meaning "vision", "hallucination", "magical power", and "miraculous ability".

Historically, henbane was used in combination with other plants, such as the mandrake, the deadly nightshade, and datura, as an anaesthetic potion, and for its psychoactive properties in "magic brews". These psychoactive properties include visual hallucinations and a sensation of flight. It was originally used in continental Europe, Asia, and the Arab world, though it did spread to England in the Middle Ages. The use of henbane by the ancient Romans was documented by Pliny, who said it was "of the nature of wine and therefore offensive to the understanding", and by Dioscorides, who recommended it as a sedative and analgesic.

The plant, recorded as Herba Apollinaris, was used to yield oracles by the priestesses of Apollo. Recently evidence for its use in the earlier British Neolithic has been debated. John Gerard's Herball states: "The leaves, the seeds and the juice, when taken internally cause an unquiet sleep, like unto the sleep of drunkenness, which continueth long and is deadly to the patient. To wash the feet in a decoction of Henbane, as also the often smelling of the flowers causeth sleep."

The plant was also purportedly used as a fumigant for magical purposes. Albertus Magnus, in his work De Vegetalibus (1250), reported that necromancers used henbane to invoke the souls of the dead as well as demons. Henbane was already being demonized as early as the Late Middle Ages when it became inseparably associated with witchcraft and malefic practices. "The witches drank the decoction of henbane and had those dreams for which they were tortured and executed. It was also used for witches' ointments and was used for making weather and conjuring spirits. If there were a great drought then a stalk of henbane would be dipped into a spring, then the sun-baked sand would be sprinkled with this" (Perger 1864, 181).

Henbane was discovered among an assortment of imported spices during the underwater archaeological excavation of the royal Danish-Norwegian flagship, Gribshunden, which sank in 1495 near Ronneby, Sweden. The purpose of this henbane is not known, but could have been medicinal for soothing toothache, or as an anti-emetic and to prevent motion sickness.

During a Pomeranian witchcraft trial in 1538, a suspected witch "confessed" that she had given a man henbane seeds so that he would run around "crazy" (sexually aroused). In a file from an Inquisition trial, it was noted that "a witch admits" having once strewn henbane seeds between two lovers and uttering the following formula: "Here I sow wild seed, and the devil advised that they would hate and avoid each other until these seeds had been separated" (Marzell 1922, 169).

Henbane was one of the ingredients in gruit, traditionally used in beers as a flavouring. The recipe for henbane beer includes 40 g dried chopped henbane herbage, 5 g bayberry, 23 L water, 1 L brewing malt, 900 g honey, 5 g dried yeast, and brown sugar. Henbane fell out of usage for beer when it was replaced by hops in the 11th to 16th centuries; in Bavaria the Purity Law of 1516 outlawed ingredients other than barley, hops, yeast, and water.

Henbane is sometimes identified with the "hebenon" poured into the ear of Hamlet's father, although other candidates for hebenon exist.

=== Theories ===
Henbane seeds have been found in a Viking grave near Fyrkat, Denmark, that was first described in 1977. This and other archaeological finds show that H. niger was known to the Vikings. Analysis of the symptoms caused by intoxication of this plant suggest that it may have been used by berserkers to induce the rage state that they used in war.

== Cultivation and use ==
Henbane cultivation, Lilly Experimental Farm, 1919

Henbane originated in Eurasia, and is now globally distributed as a plant grown mainly for pharmaceutical purposes. Henbane is rare in northern Europe; its cultivation for medicinal use is widespread and legal in central and eastern Europe and in India. Seeds of henbane from north-west Himalaya are reported to exhibit dormancy, and germination can be induced by the application of gibberellic acid, nitrates, sodium nitroprusside (SNP) and by moist cold stratification. Sharma (2024) observed that fully matured seeds of H. niger exhibited dormancy and in contrast, the comparatively immature seeds germinated well. The latter can be manipulated for the propagation of Henbane without seed pre-treatments.

Henbane is used in traditional herbal medicine for ailments of the bones, rheumatism, toothache, asthma, cough, nervous diseases, and stomach pain. It might also be used as analgesic, sedative, and narcotic in some cultures. Adhesive bandages with henbane extract behind the ear are reported to prevent discomfort in travel-sick people. Henbane oil is used for medicinal massage.

Henbane material in most Western countries can be bought in pharmacies with a prescription only. Sales of henbane oil are not legally regulated and are allowed in shops other than pharmacies in the US.

Henbane has travelled through the company of Romani people.

== Preparation, dosage, toxicity ==
Henbane leaves and herbage without roots are chopped and dried and are then used for medicinal purposes or in incense and smoking blends, in making beer and tea, and in seasoning wine. Henbane leaves are boiled in oil to derive henbane oil. Henbane seeds are an ingredient in incense blends. In all preparations, the dosage has to be carefully estimated as henbane is highly toxic. For some therapeutic applications, dosages like 0.5 g and 1.5–3 g were used. The lethal dosage is not known.

Henbane is toxic to cattle, wild animals, fish, and birds. Not all animals are susceptible; for example, the larvae of some Lepidoptera species, including cabbage moths, eat henbane. Pigs are immune to henbane toxicity and are reported to enjoy the effects of the plant.

== Psychoactive material ==
Hyoscyamine, scopolamine, and other tropane alkaloids have been found in the foliage and seeds of the plant. The standard alkaloid content has been reported to be 0.03% to 0.28%.

The lignanamides hyoscyamide, grossamide, and cannabisins D and G have been identified in the seeds of Hyoscyamus niger.

Its psychoactive and pharmacological effects are a result of these alkaloids exerting an anticholinergic mechanism of action which blocks the function of acetylcholine in the brain and antagonizes the muscarinic receptors. This results in an altered state of consciousness, hallucinogenic experiences, and typically, delirium. This mechanism of action is not only linked to dangerous effects and accidents, but dementia as well. Since toxicity/lethality is such a major concern with plants like henbane, many traditional preparations of henbane or other similar scopolamine-containing plants were designed to be applied transdermally, often in "magical ointments" by herbalists, witches and cunning folk. The purpose of this was to absorb the primary and transdermally-active alkaloid scopolamine through the skin, thus eliminating the risk of the additional toxicity from atropine and hyoscyamine that is inevitably present with oral ingestion of the plant but not with topical use.

== Effects ==
Henbane ingestion by humans is followed simultaneously by peripheral inhibition and central stimulation. Common effects of henbane ingestion include hallucinations, dilated pupils, narcosis, restlessness, and flushed skin. Less common effects are tachycardia, convulsions, vomiting, hypertension, hyperpyrexia, and ataxia. Initial effects typically last for three to four hours, while aftereffects may last up to three days. The side effects of henbane ingestion are dryness in the mouth, confusion, visual illusions, bizarre thoughts, locomotor and memory disturbances, and farsightedness, similar in style to those of other tropane-based deliriants, such as plants of the New World genus Datura. As a result of this distinct chemical and pharmacological profile, overdoses can result not only in delirium, but also severe anticholinergic syndrome, coma, respiratory paralysis, and death. Low and average dosages have inebriating and aphrodisiac effects.

In his book How Do Witches Fly?, Alexander Kuklin refers to an experience of black henbane had by German scientist Michael Schenck. Schenck recalled his experience:

The henbane's first effect was purely physical discomfort. My limbs lost certainty, pains hammered in my head, and I began to feel extremely giddy ... I went to the mirror and was able to distinguish my face, but more dimly than normal. It looked flushed and must have been so. I had the feeling that my head had increased in size: it seemed to have grown broader, more solid, heavier, and I imagined that it was enveloped in firmer, thicker skin. The mirror itself seemed to be swaying, and I found it difficult to keep my face within its frame. The black discs of my pupils were immensely enlarged, as though the whole iris, which was normally blue, had become black. Despite of the dilation of my pupils I could see no better than usual; quite the contrary, the outlines of objects were hazy, the window and the window frame were obscured by a thin mist.

Schenck's pulse became rapid and he experienced a further increase in the hallucinogenic effects of the plant:

There were animals which looked at me keenly with contorted grimaces and staring, terrified eyes; there were terrifying stones and clouds of mist, all sweeping along in the same direction. They carried me irresistibly with them. Their coloring must be described—but it was not a pure hue. They enveloped in a vague gray light, which emitted a dull glow and rolled onward and upward into a black and smoky sky. I was flung into a flaring drunkenness, a witches' cauldron of madness. Above my head water was flowing, dark and blood-red. The sky was filled with herds of animals. Fluid, formless creatures emerged from the darkness. I heard words, but they were all wrong and nonsensical, and yet they possessed for me some hidden meaning.

== Misidentification ==
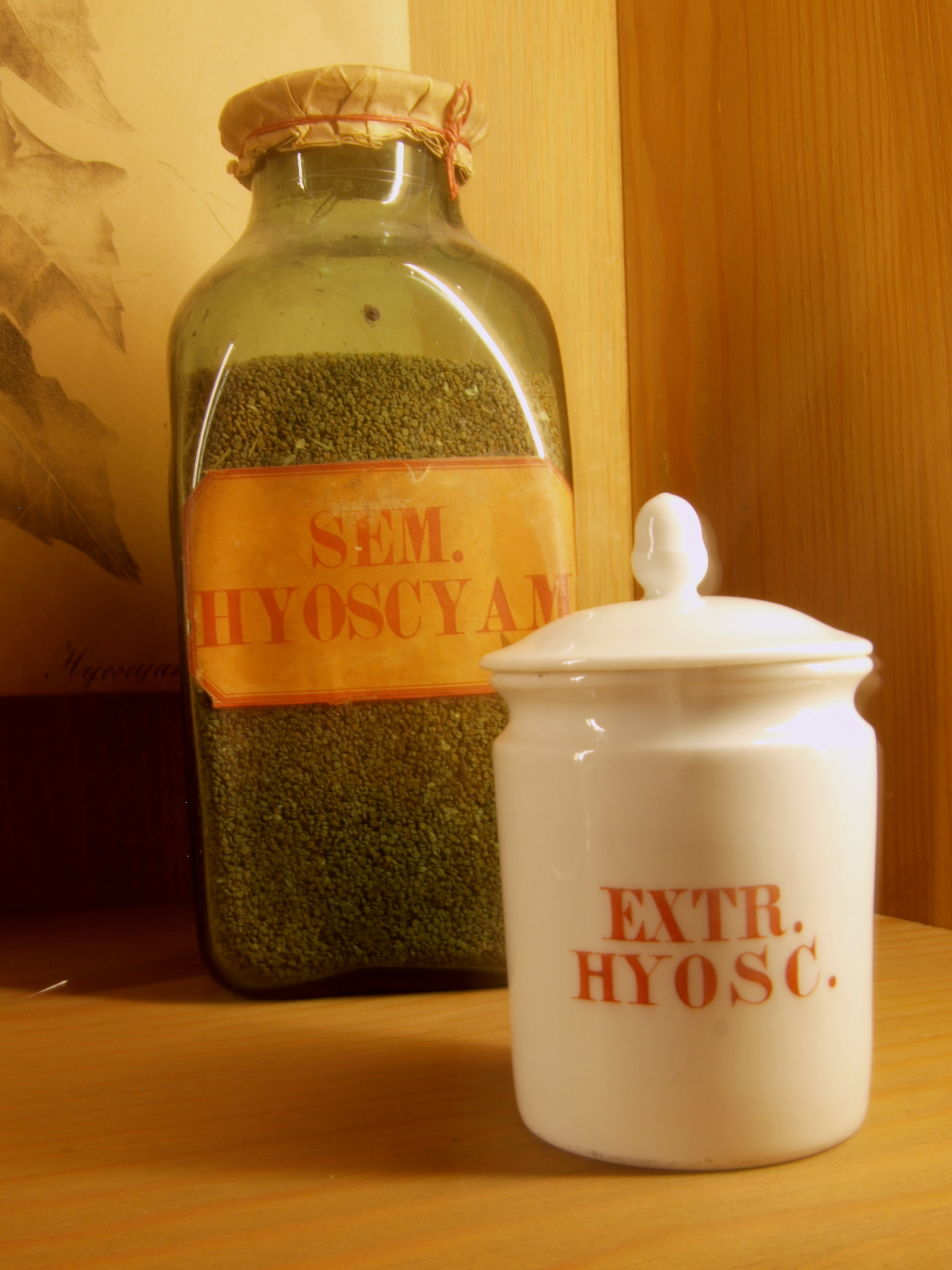
Apothecary vessels for Hyoscyamus preparations, Germany, 19th century

Celebrity chef Antony Worrall Thompson accidentally recommended henbane as a "tasty addition to salads" in the August 2008 issue of Healthy and Organic Living magazine.
The publication promptly warned subscribers against consuming the "very toxic" plant upon discovery of the error, and Thompson admitted to confusing it with fat hen, a member of the spinach family.

== Gallery ==
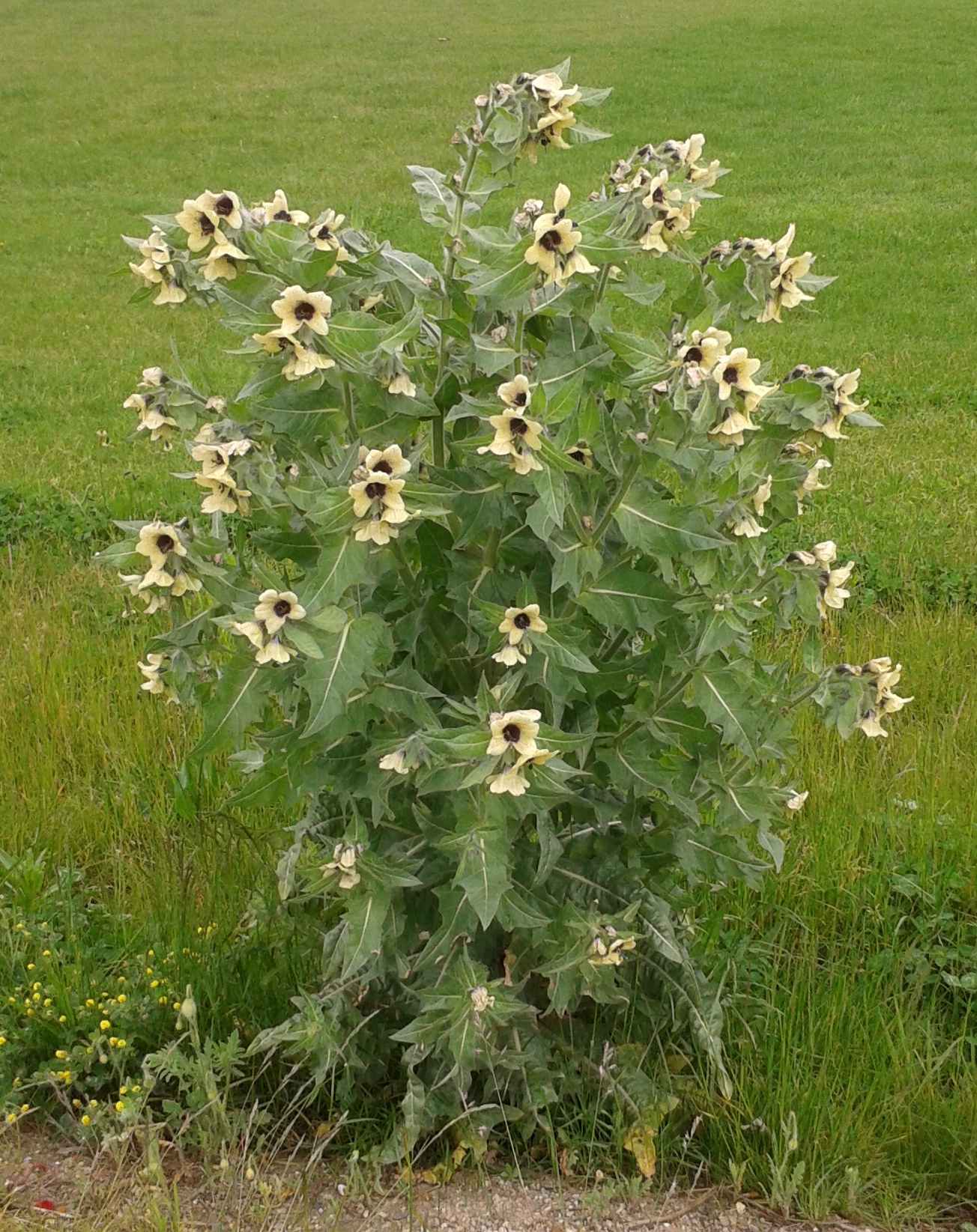
Large flowering henbane

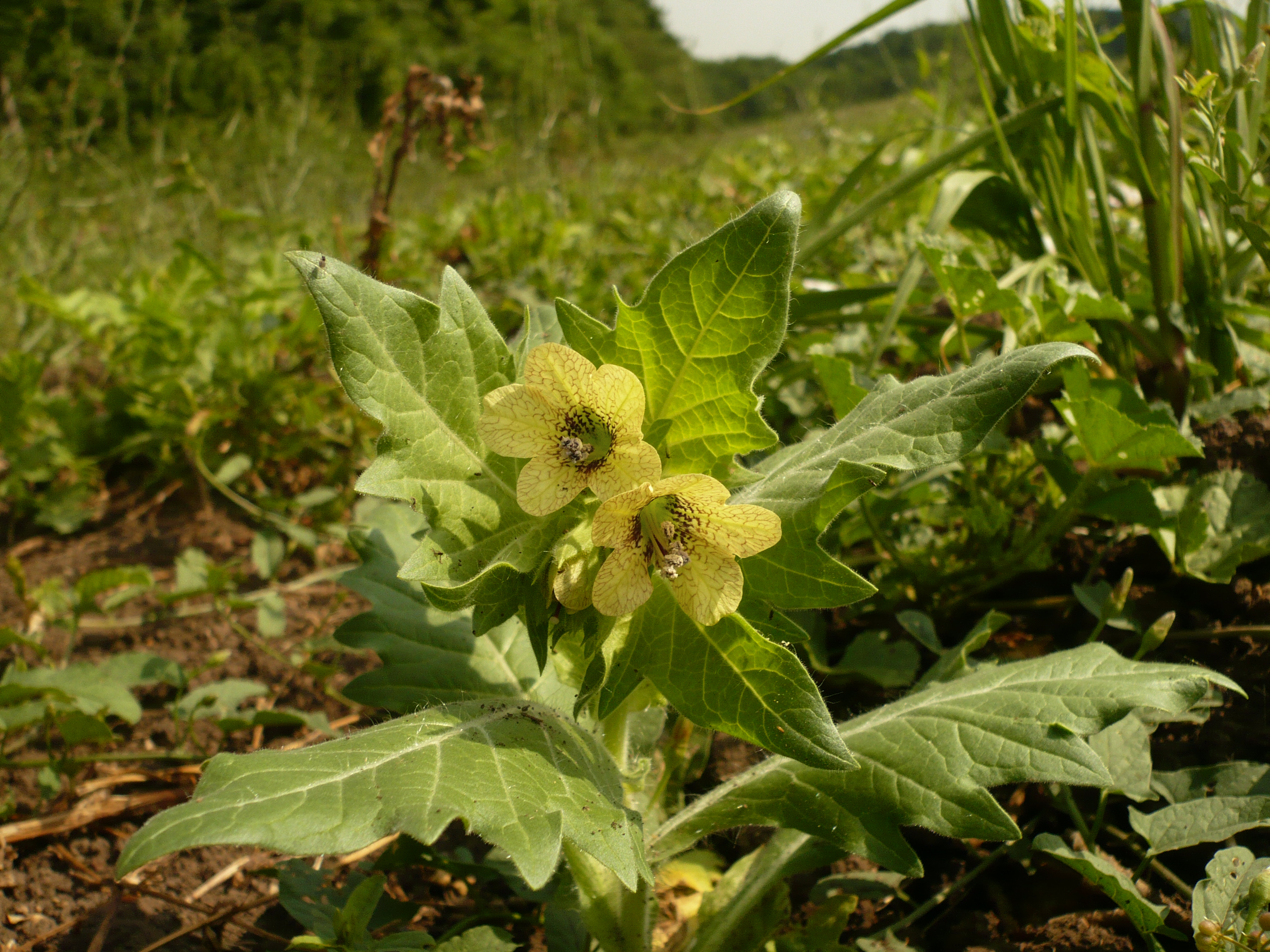
Henbane in flower

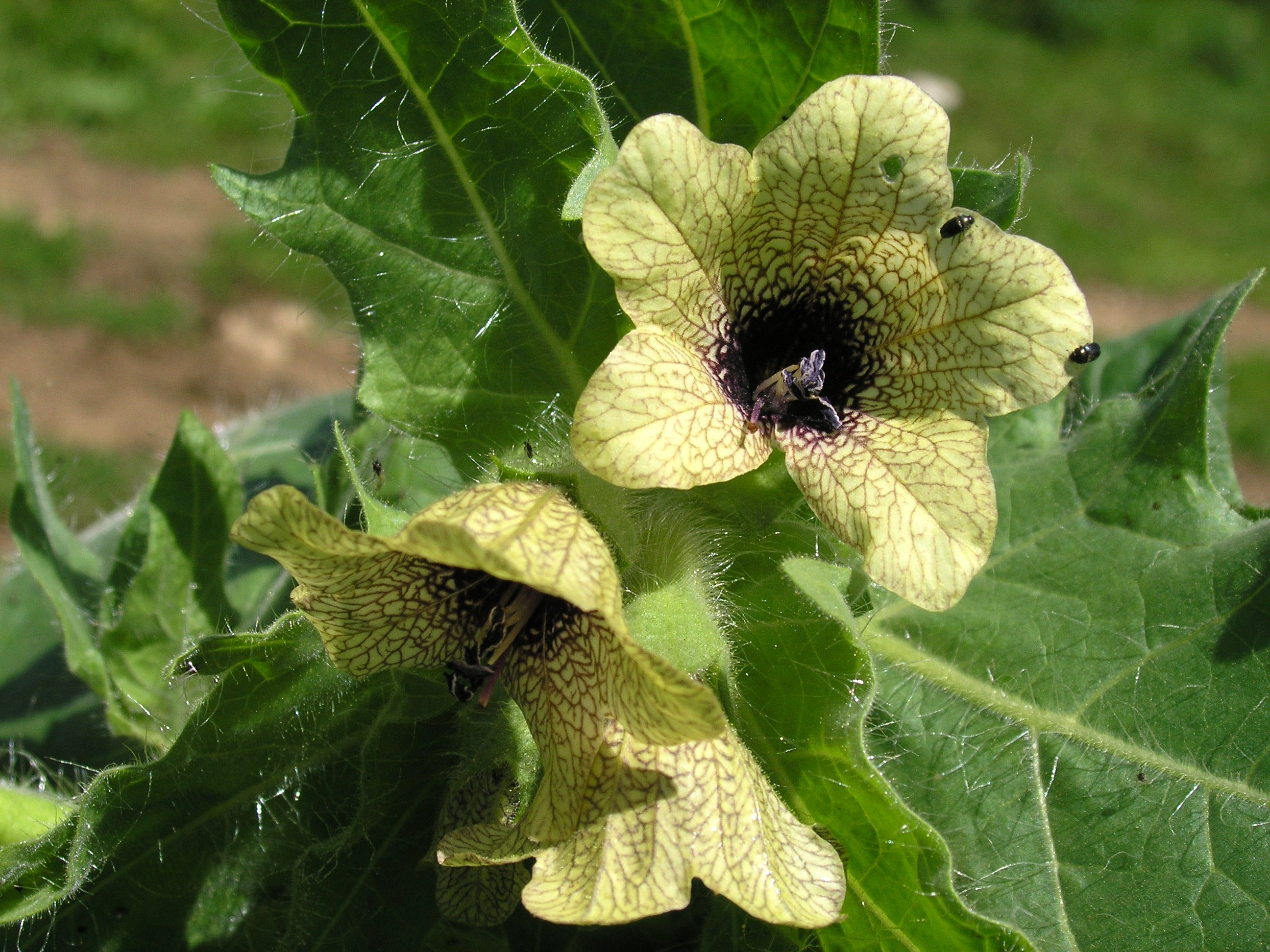
Close-up of flower

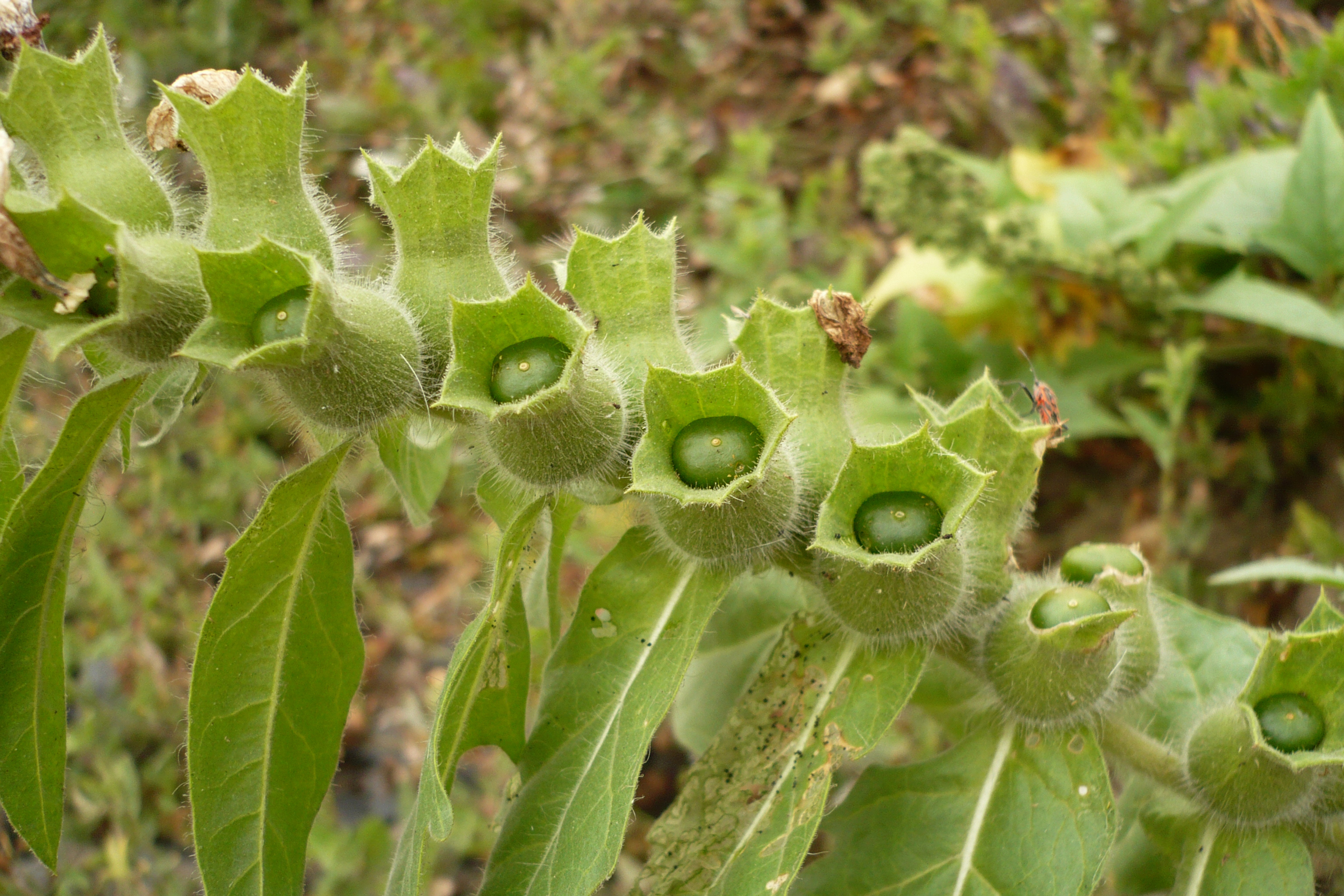
Henbane fruits

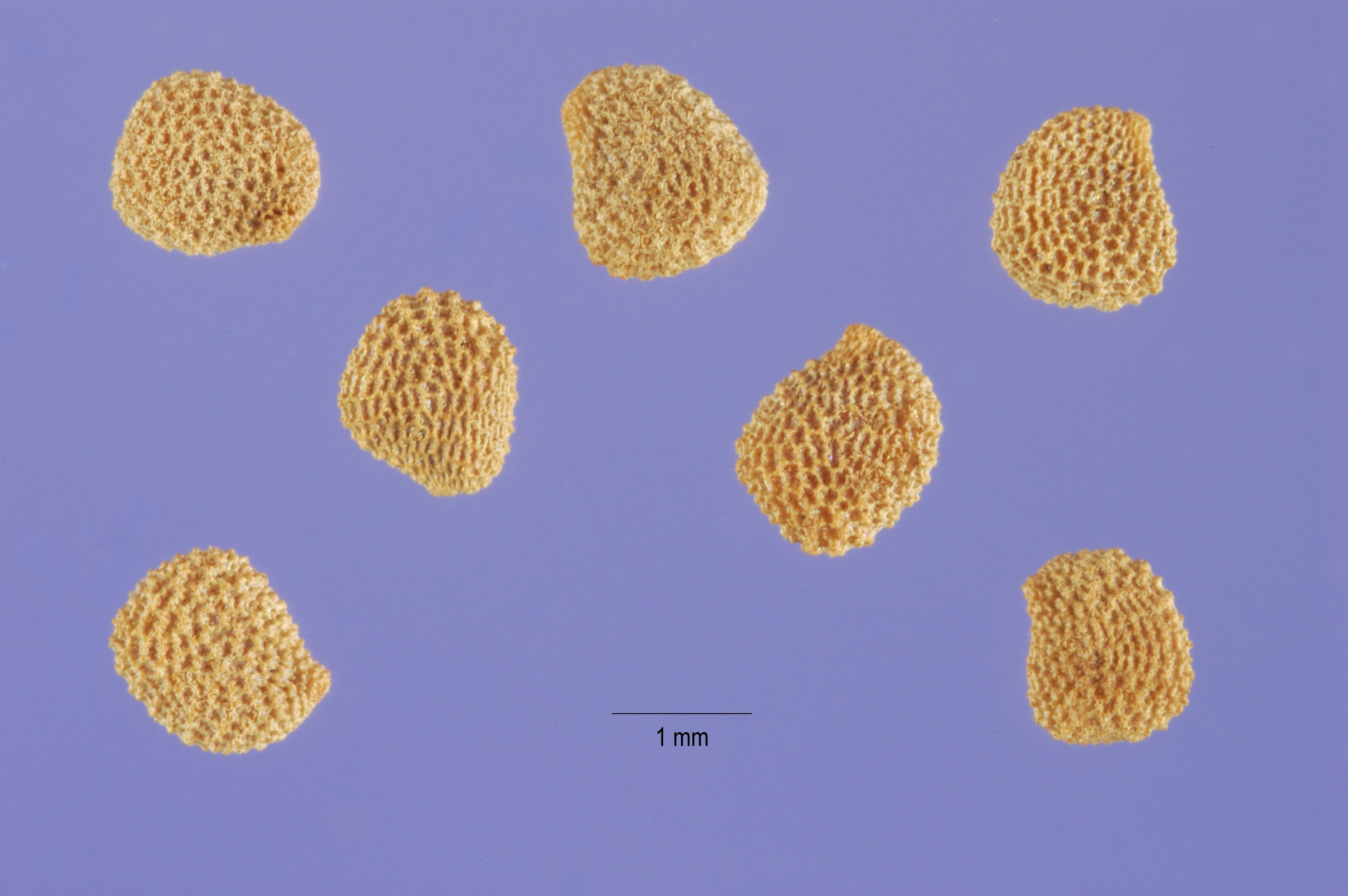
Henbane seeds
