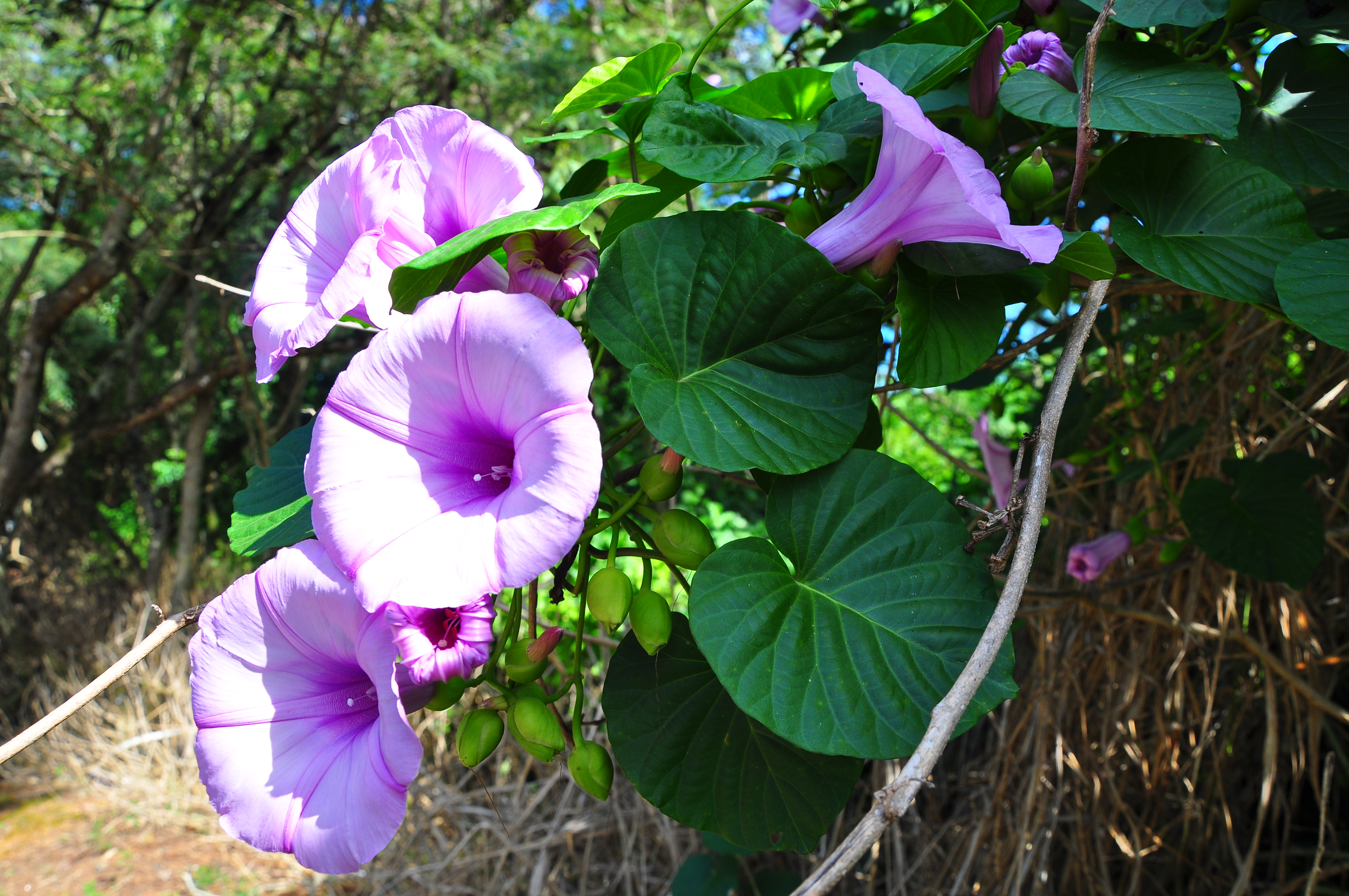

Scientific classification
- Kingdom: Plantae
- Clade: Tracheophytes
- Clade: Angiosperms
- Clade: Eudicots
- Clade: Asterids
- Order: Solanales
- Family: Convolvulaceae
- Genus: Stictocardia
- Species: S. tiliifolia

Binomial name
- Stictocardia tiliifolia (Desr.) Hallier f.

= Stictocardia tiliifolia =

Species of plant

Stictocardia tiliifolia, also known by common names such as spottedheart and batatilla, is a species of vine and flowering plant of the morning glory family native to Panama. The seeds of the plant are said to contain large amounts of ergolines such as ergine (lysergic acid amide; LSA) similarly to Argyreia nervosa (Hawaiian baby woodrose). Relatedly, Stictocardia tiliifolia seeds have sometimes been claimed to be psychoactive or hallucinogenic similarly to other such morning glory species like Argyreia nervosa, Ipomoea tricolor, and Ipomoea corymbosa.

== See also ==
- Morning glory (drug)
