= Morning glory (drug) =

Plant and hallucinogen

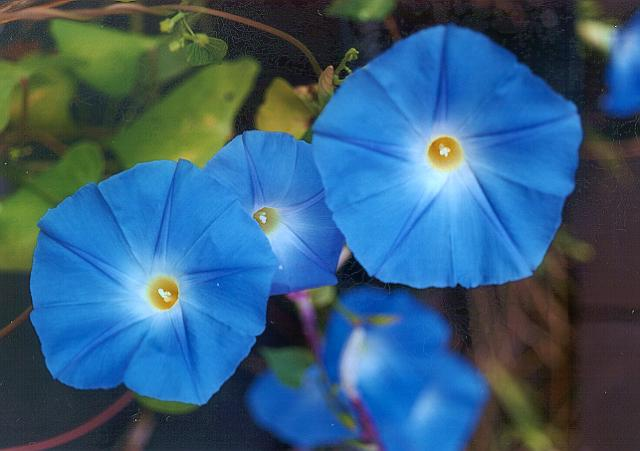
- Ipomoea tricolor, the seeds of which are the most commonly used hallucinogenic morning glory seeds
- Source plant(s): Morning glory species (e.g., Ipomoea tricolor, Ipomoea corymbosa, Argyreia nervosa, others)
- Part(s) of plant: Seeds (ground, soaked, and filtered)
- Active ingredients: Ergine (LSA), isoergine (iso-LSA), LSH, iso-LSH, ergometrine, elymoclavine, lysergol, others
- Uses: Recreational as a hallucinogen; Entheogen for religious purposes

Morning glory, or more specifically morning glory seeds (MGS), are the seeds of morning glory (Convolvulaceae) flowering plant species and are a naturally occurring psychedelic drug. The best-known and most widely employed species specifically include Ipomoea tricolor (Note: There has been long-standing taxonomic confusion between Ipomoea tricolor and Ipomoea violacea and they have historically been mistaken as synonymous. However, Ipomoea tricolor contains ergolines and is psychoactive, whereas these alkaloids are absent in Ipomoea violacea and it is non-psychoactive. When Ipomoea violacea is referred to as a hallucinogenic morning glory, the species is actually generally Ipomoea tricolor. There is also frequent confusion of Ipomoea tricolor with Ipomoea purpurea and other species, even in the specialist literature, but Ipomoea purpurea likewise does not contain ergoline alkaloids.) (Mexican morning glory; tlitliltzin; badoh negro), Ipomoea corymbosa (Note: Ipomoea corymbosa has previously been known as Turbina corymbosa, Rivea corymbosa, and Ipomoea sidaefolia, among other synonyms.) (coaxihuitl, ololiúqui), and Argyreia nervosa (Hawaiian baby woodrose; HBWR), though many others are also active. Common cultivars of Ipomoea tricolor used for their hallucinogenic effects include heavenly blue (HBMG), pearly gates, flying saucers, and wedding bells.

Morning glory seeds contain active constituents such as the ergolines and ergot alkaloids ergine (LSA), isoergine (iso-LSA), and lysergic acid hydroxyethylamide (LSH), among others, which are closely structurally related to the synthetic psychedelic drug lysergic acid diethylamide (LSD). The ergolines present in morning glory seeds are not actually produced by the plants themselves, but instead by various symbiotic Clavicipitaceae fungi species of the Periglandula genus such as Periglandula clandestina. Constituents like ergine and isoergine are known to produce hallucinogenic effects like LSD, though with far lower potency. In addition, they have weaker and distinct psychedelic effects along with pronounced sedative effects. Morning glory seeds produce variable psychoactive effects, and the exact active constituents responsible for their psychedelic effects are not entirely clear. They tend to also produce unpleasant gastrointestinal adverse effects such as abdominal cramps, nausea, and vomiting.

The Aztecs and other indigenous peoples of the Americas have used morning glory seeds as entheogens and in traditional medicine for thousands of years. This was first observed by Spanish explorers in the 1500s. The botanical identities of these hallucinogenic morning glories were elucidated in the late 1800s through mid-1900s. Ergolines closely related to LSD were discovered to be the active constituents of morning glory seeds by Albert Hofmann in 1960. Argyreia nervosa was found to contain unusually high levels of ergoline alkaloids in the mid-1960s. Morning glory seeds emerged as a legal recreational drug and alternative to other hallucinogens regarded as more desirable such as LSD in the early 1960s. They are notably often used by teenagers and young adults due to their widespread availability, inexpensiveness, and legal nature. Recreational use has been infrequent and limited by their often unsatisfactory psychedelic effects and substantial side effects however. Some indigenous Mexican peoples such as the Zapotec and Mazatec as well as indigenous Ecuadorians continue to use morning glory seeds as entheogens into modern times. Morning glories are legal in much of the world, but constituents such as ergine and ergometrine are controlled substances in some countries.

== Use and effects ==
Morning glory seeds of different species vary in potency due to differing alkaloid contents. Argyreia nervosa seeds are several-fold more potent than Ipomoea tricolor seeds, and Ipomoea tricolor seeds are several-fold more potent than Ipomoea corymbosa seeds. For Ipomoea tricolor, low doses are 20 to 50 seeds, moderate doses are 50 to 150 seeds or 150 to 200 seeds, and high doses are 300 seeds or more. In the case of Ipomoea corymbosa, doses are not well-characterized, but 60 to 100 seeds produced some effects, while up to many as 300 to 500 seeds have been tried but with unsatisfactory results and severe side effects. For Argyreia nervosa, initial doses are 2 to 3 seeds, while typical or moderate doses are 4 to 8 seeds or 5 to 10 seeds, a high dose is 10 seeds, and maximum doses are 13 to 14 seeds. Large doses of morning glory seeds are not recommended, due to pronounced nausea and vomiting as well as possible ergotism-like adverse effects. Concentrations of the active constituents of morning glory seeds and hence doses can vary considerably even within the same species. Argyreia nervosa seeds were once the most potent known naturally occurring psychedelic, with typical doses in the range of 0.4 to 1.0 g (each seed weighing ~0.1 g), but this was later superseded by the much more potent 5-MeO-DMT-containing venom of the Sonoran Desert toad.

Seeds of major hallucinogenic morning glory species
Ipomoea tricolor seeds

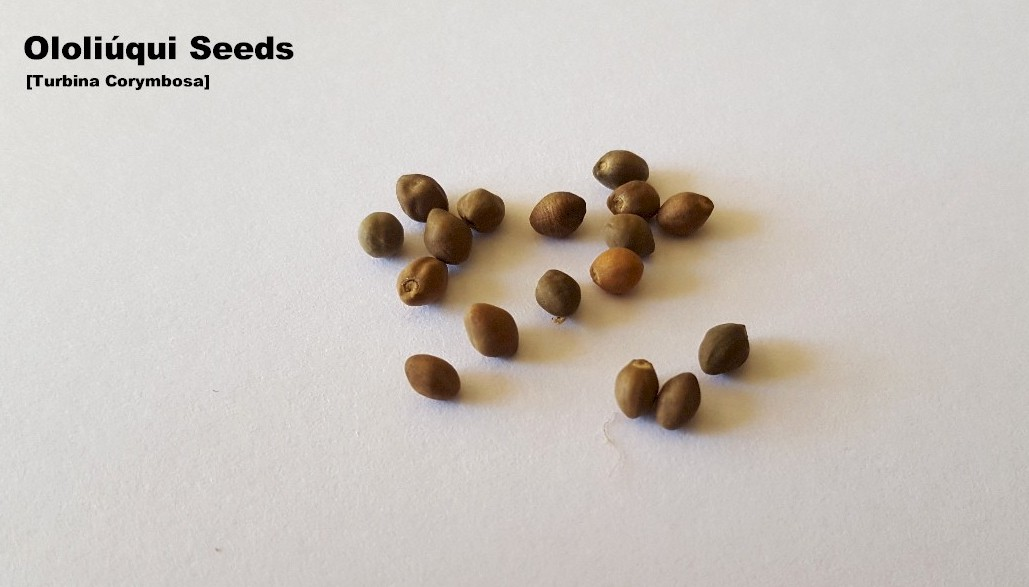
Ipomoea corymbosa seeds

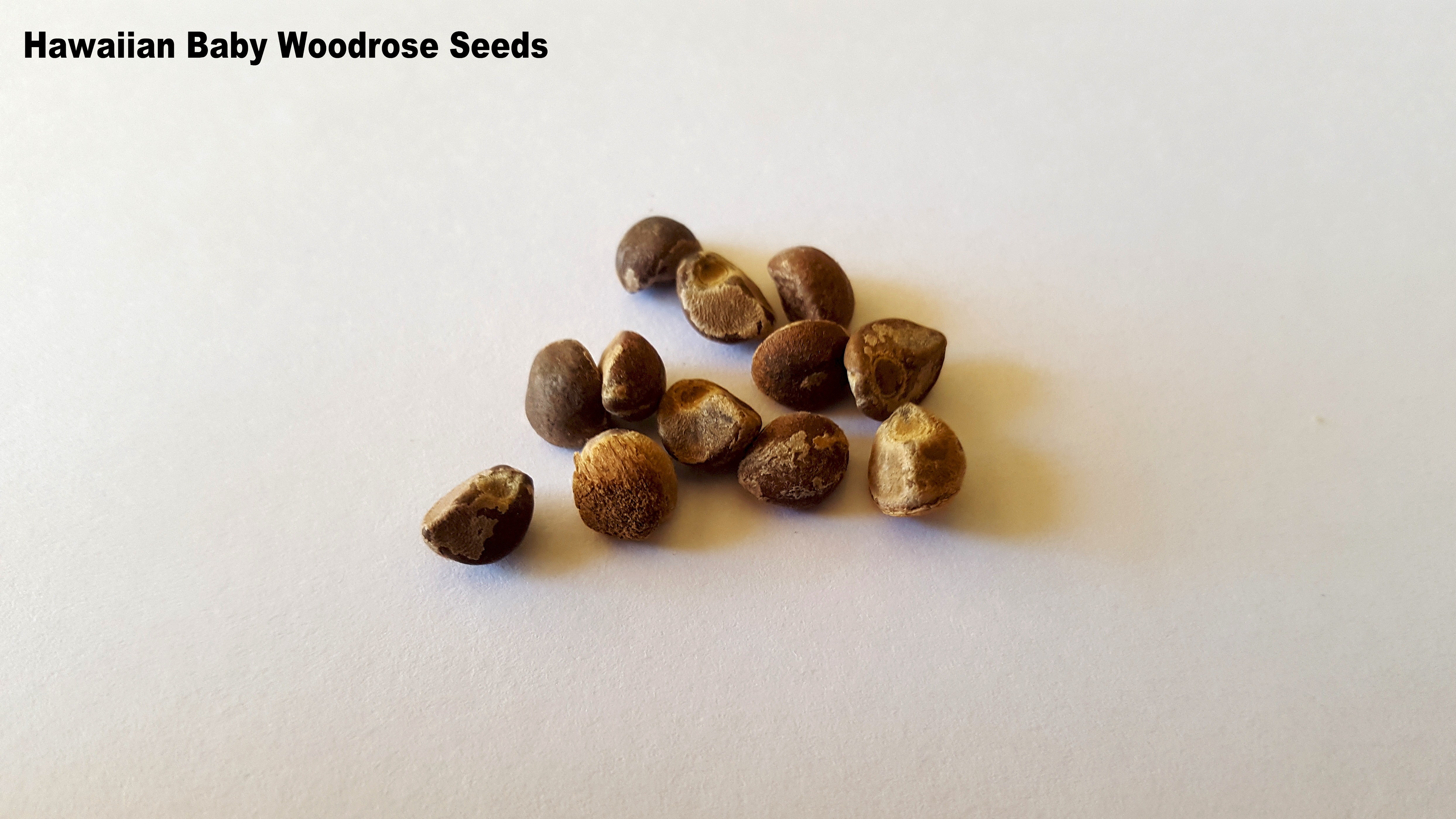
Argyreia nervosa seeds

Morning glory seeds are not ingested whole as they are inactive in this form. Instead, they are ground into a fine powder, soaked for several hours or days in cold water, the solid matter is filtered or strained out, and then the remaining liquid is orally drunk. This is also how indigenous peoples use the seeds as entheogens. The onset of morning glory seeds is 0.5 to 4 hours and their duration is typically 4 to 10 hours. The leaves, stems, and roots of morning glories also contain the active alkaloids, but these are not used for psychoactive purposes.

Effects of morning glory seeds may include closed-eye mental imagery, open-eye visual hallucinations, auditory hallucinations, synesthesia, mood elevation or euphoria, laughter, sedation, and fatigue, among others. The effects of morning glory seeds are said to be different from those of LSD. The euphoric and hallucinogenic effects are said to be much less pronounced, while feelings of "mental emptiness", anxiety, depression, weariness, and lassitude are predominant. In addition, LSD is described as a very specific hallucinogen, whereas morning glory seeds have a pronounced "sedative" component. Sometimes, morning glory seeds even at high doses have been found to produce only sedative and dysphoric effects with no hallucinogenic effects. In any case, some authors have nonetheless written positively about experiences with morning glory seeds. Reports with Argyreia nervosa specifically are conflicting, with some reporting very LSD-like experiences, whereas other experiences have been much more mixed. Most people find morning glory seed experiences to be unpleasant due to adverse effects and do not wish to repeat them. Morning glory seeds can produce after-effects, such as invigoration as well as hangover symptoms.

According to Keeper Trout, the psychoactive effects of morning glory seeds are highly variable in general, with the experiences sometimes being very similar to those of LSD, including powerful psychedelic visuals, but most of the time not being so and instead being more sedative. The reasons for this are unknown, though he suggested that it may be due to varying alkaloid compositions. In relation to the varying effects, Trout has said that there is a great deal of mythology surrounding morning glory seeds and their active constituents in the psychedelic community.

=== Isolated constituents ===
Albert Hofmann found that the crude indole fraction of Ipomoea corymbosa at a dose of 2 mg orally produced a dream-like state, altered perception of objects and colors, and drowsiness. However, another group found that crude extracts of 5 mg orally produced mainly drowsiness.

Ergine is often assumed to be the main active hallucinogenic constituent in morning glory seeds. However, it is not actually clear that this is the case. Ergine at doses of 0.5 to 1 mg by intramuscular or subcutaneous injection or 1 to 2 mg orally was assessed by Hofmann and produced pronounced sedation and weak hallucinogenic effects. Isoergine at 2 mg orally caused tiredness, apathy, a feeling of mental emptiness, unreality, and meaninglessness of the outside world. Hofmann has also described 1 to 2 mg active alkaloids orally as producing a very strange sense of voidness, where everything loses its meaning, and said that it is a "very mystical experience". E. Heim and colleagues assessed ergine at higher doses of 3 to 6 mg orally and observed toxic-like effects, whereas isoergine at 2 to 5 mg orally produced notable hallucinogenic effects, including some euphoria, synaesthesia, and altered time perception. Lysergic acid hydroxyethylamide (LSH) is unstable and has not been tested in humans. Active constituents like ergine are said to be 20 to 100 times less potent than LSD in producing psychoactive effects.

Lysergol (up to 8 mg orally) and elymoclavine (doses unspecified) produced sedative effects and no hallucinogenic effects and hence do not appear to contribute to the psychedelic effects of morning glory seeds. Ergometrine (ergonovine) produces psychedelic effects at doses of 1.5 to 10 mg orally, with slight effects occurring at 1.5 mg and more significant effects occurring at 5 to 10 mg. However, ergometrine is a minor constituent making up only to 8% of total alkaloids (~1 mg present in 500 seeds of Ipomoea tricolor), which has been considered to be too low to contribute meaningfully to their effects at typical doses. In addition, ergometrine is present in Ipomoea tricolor and Argyreia nervosa but not in Ipomoea corymbosa. Methylergometrine (methylergonovine) has been reported to produce psychedelic effects at a dose of 2 mg orally, with the effects at this dose equivalent to those of ergometrine 10 mg orally. It has been detected in Argyreia nervosa, but quantities are unknown. Both ergometrine and methylergometrine are reported to produce pronounced and intolerable side effects at psychedelic doses.

Hofmann has stated that the active constituents ergine, isoergine, LSH, elymoclavine, lysergol, and ergometrine are responsible for the hallucinogenic effects of morning glory seeds. On the other hand, Heim and colleagues concluded based on their clinical findings that isoergine is the main active psychedelic constituent of morning glory seeds, while ergine mainly contributes side effects such as sedation and autonomic changes. Others have stated that ergine and isoergine are the main active constituents. Conversely, Alexander Shulgin in his book TiHKAL (Tryptamines I Have Known and Loved) has stated that both ergine and isoergine probably do not contribute to the hallucinogenic effects of morning glory seeds, as he felt that the effects of morning glory seeds and these compounds in their pure form are very different. Instead, in an early review, Shulgin suggested that LSH might contribute to the hallucinogenic effects of morning glory seeds. However, in subsequent reviews, he stated only that LSH might serve as a metabolic precursor (prodrug) of ergine, and he did not mention nor implicate LSH in the effects of morning glory seeds in TiHKAL. Keeper Trout has also suggested that lesser-studied alkaloids, possibly including LSH, might be involved, but expressed that more research is needed. There has been little further formal investigation of the active constituents of morning glory seeds since the 1960s.

=== Lesser-known species ===
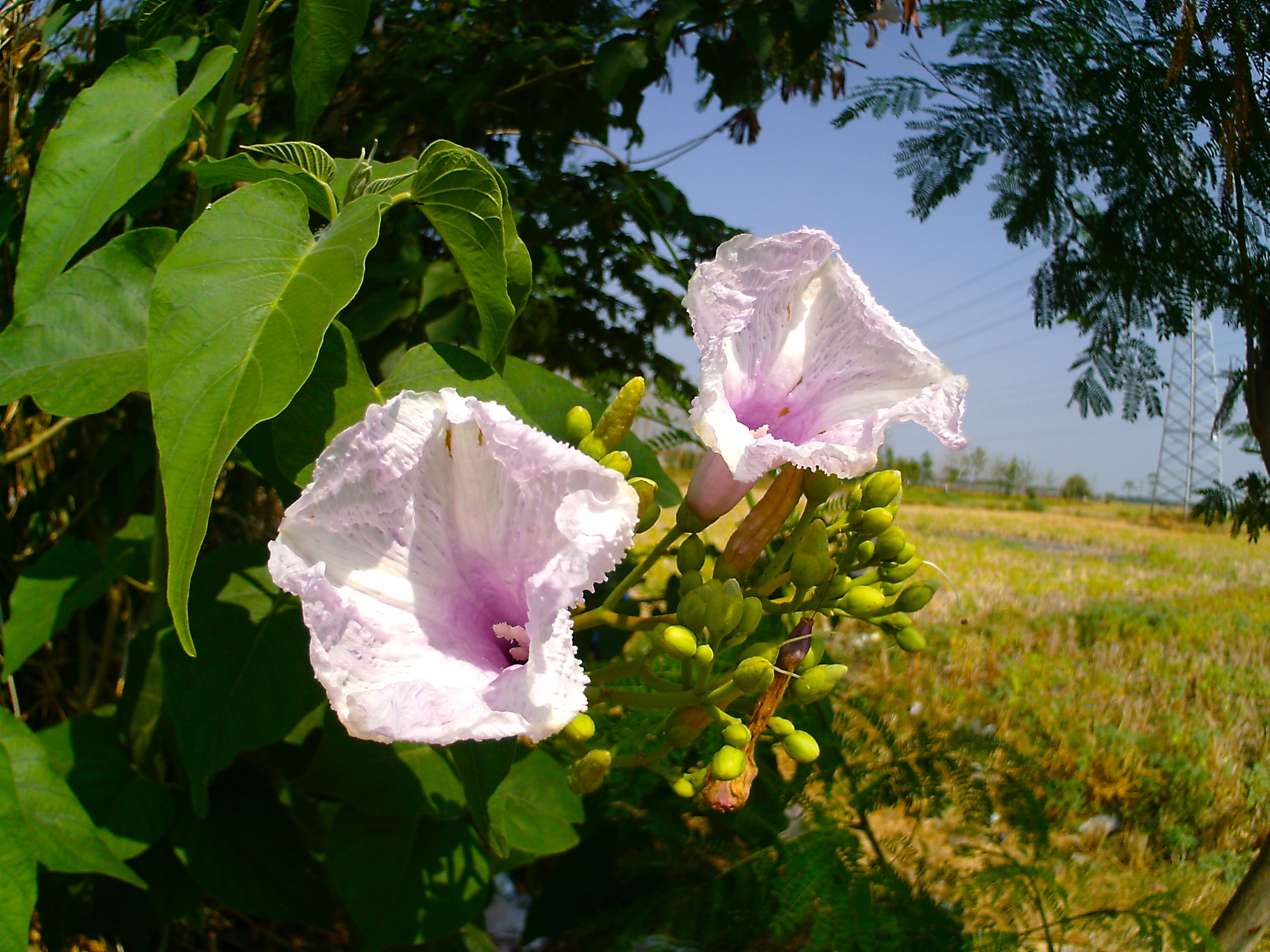
The seeds of Ipomoea carnea (pink morning glory, borrachero, matacabra) are used as an entheogen by indigenous peoples in Ecuador.

Numerous other morning glory species besides the most commonly employed hallucinogenic species of Argyreia nervosa, Ipomoea tricolor, and Ipomoea corymbosa have also been reported to contain ergolines and, less frequently, to be psychoactive. Examples include Ipomoea asarifolia (ginger-leaf morning glory), Ipomoea carnea (pink morning glory, borrachero, matacabra), Distimake tuberosus (Hawaiian wood rose) (reports conflicting), and Convolvulus tricolor (dwarf morning glory), among many others. Stictocardia tiliifolia (spottedheart, batatilla), a morning glory species found in Panama, is said to have high alkaloid content similarly to Argyreia nervosa and to possibly be psychoactive. Ipomoea batatas (sweet potatoes) are a notable morning glory species used widely as food that is not thought to contain ergoline alkaloids.

== Contraindications ==
The active constituents of morning glory seeds, as well as LSD, are strongly uterotonic, and should never be taken by pregnant women, as they could potentially induce uterine contractions and premature labor. Other potential contraindications of morning glory seeds may include cardiovascular disease, various other medical conditions, and breastfeeding, among others, but have not been formally well-characterized.

== Adverse effects ==
Morning glory seeds often produce pronounced gastrointestinal disturbances such as abdominal cramping, nausea and vomiting, and diarrhea. This has led to informal beliefs that the seeds might naturally contain strychnine or might be coated with poison to discourage recreational use. Some seed brands have indeed been coated with emetics such as "Thirium 50", whereas others have not been, with this stated on the seed packages. Many users feel that the psychedelic experience with morning glory seeds is not worth their gastrointestinal side effects.

Other physical side effects of morning glory seeds may include vertigo, hypertension, hypotension, tachycardia, tachypnea, diaphoresis, dizziness, tremors, mydriasis, nystagmus, blurred vision, tremors, and headache. Hangover symptoms such as nausea, constipation, vertigo, blurred vision, and physical inertia have been reported. Large doses of morning glory seeds may produce pronounced nausea and vomiting as well as ergotism-like symptoms, for instance vasoconstriction and the limbs becoming bluish. Use of filtered, cold-water infusions of ground seeds may produce fewer undesirable gastrointestinal and other side effects than whole ground seeds.

Psychological adverse effects include mood swings, sedation, sleepiness, weakness, fatigue, lethargy, apathy, depression, and dysphoria. Cognitive and memory impairment, confusion, and speech difficulties like aphasia may occur. Morning glory seeds can cause "bad trips", including symptoms like anxiety, panic attacks, derealization, agitation, aggression, paranoia, and delusions. A talk-down approach, including supportive and comforting interactions, can help manage such experiences. Benzodiazepines for sedation and anxiolysis can also be employed.

There is a case report of death due to jumping out of a window while on morning glory seeds and a case report of suicide after use of morning glory seeds. There are also case reports of psychosis and flashbacks consequent to use of morning glory seeds. There is a case report of posterior reversible encephalopathy syndrome (PRES) with status epilepticus due to ergine consumption. The long-term toxicity of morning glory seeds has been little-studied and is unknown.

== Overdose ==
There are reports of large overdoses of morning glory seeds, for instance 15 to 20 Argyreia nervosa seeds and 1,000 to 2,000 Ipomoea tricolor seeds. A case of 20 Argyreia nervosa seeds caused sharp abdominal pain, while an instance of 1,000 to 1,200 Ipomoea tricolor seeds resulted in intense psychedelic effects, a bad and traumatic experience, and hospitalization. Overdose in general may cause pronounced hallucinogenic effects, erratic and unusual behavior and ideation, and strong physical side effects. Antipsychotics such as risperidone and benzodiazepines such as lorazepam can be used to help manage morning glory seed intoxication and overdose.

== Interactions ==
Interactions with morning glory seeds have been little-studied. There is a case report of serotonin syndrome occurring with morning glory seeds in combination with amitriptyline and fluoxetine. Morning glory seeds are often combined with cannabis or alcohol by recreational users and this might result in interactions. In general, serotonin 5-HT_{2A} receptor antagonists, for instance ketanserin, risperidone, and trazodone, among many others, are "trip killers" against serotonergic psychedelics and can diminish or abort their hallucinogenic effects.

== Pharmacology ==
=== Pharmacodynamics ===
The exact constituents of morning glory seeds responsible for their hallucinogenic effects remain unknown and controversial. However, ergoline and lysergamide alkaloids including ergine, isoergine, lysergic acid hydroxyethylamide (LSH), ergometrine, lysergol, and elymoclavine have all been implicated. It is often assumed that ergine is the major hallucinogenic constituent of the seeds, but findings are conflicting and it is not clear that this is actually the case. In fact, isoergine showed more hallucinogenic-like effects than ergine in clinical studies, though it still did not produce clear LSD-like psychedelic effects such as visuals that sometimes occur with morning glory seeds. Morning glory seeds produce highly variable psychoactive effects in humans, most of the time producing sedation with less-pronounced hallucinogenic effects, but sometimes producing robust LSD-like psychedelic effects including visuals, albeit always with at least some sedative component. The reasons for this are unknown but are presumably due to varying alkaloid compositions. The specific active constituents aside, serotonergic psychedelics, including LSD and morning glory seeds, are thought to produce their hallucinogenic effects via activation of serotonin 5-HT_{2A} receptors.

Ergine has shown affinity for various serotonin, dopamine, and adrenergic receptors. It showed higher affinity for the serotonin 5-HT_{1A} and 5-HT_{2A} receptor than for dopamine receptors. The drug has shown 30- to 120-fold lower affinity for the serotonin 5-HT_{2A} receptor than LSD. Ergine has been found to act as a serotonin 5-HT_{2A} receptor partial agonist similarly to LSD. Compared to LSD, it was an agonist of the receptor with 5-fold lower activational potency but similar efficacy for G_{q} calcium signaling, whereas it showed 112-fold lower activational potency and slightly reduced efficacy for β-arrestin2 signaling. Ergine produces effects in animals such as mydriasis, piloerection, hypothermia, and restlessness.

Isoergine has shown affinity for serotonin receptors in an early non-specific assay. Its affinity for these serotonin receptors was similar to that of ergine but was 10- to 25-fold lower than that of LSD. The drug shows behavioral effects in animals, for instance activity in the conditioned avoidance response test, albeit with 33-fold lower potency compared to LSD. LSH produces sympathomimetic effects, uterotonic effects, piloerection, mydriasis, and hyperthermia in animals, suggesting that it could produce LSD-like effects in humans. However, LSH is chemicallly unstable and may simply function as a prodrug of ergine once inside of the body. Elymoclavine and lysergol produce excitation in animals. Chanoclavine does not appear to be pharmacologically active. Ergometrine produces the head-twitch response, a behavioral proxy of psychedelic effects, in rodents, but with 222-fold lower potency than LSD.

Extracts of Ipomoea tricolor and Argyreia nervosa seeds have been found to decrease behavioral activity in multiple tests in rodents, actions suggestive of morning glory seeds producing sedative- and antipsychotic-like effects, consistent with reports in humans.

=== Pharmacokinetics ===
The pharmacokinetics of isoergine have been studied in rodents. In addition, the pharmacokinetics of ergine following administration of Argyreia nervosa seeds in humans have been limitedly studied. Metabolites formed from Argyreia nervosa seed consumption in humans have been reported to include the 2-hydroxy-3-oxo- metabolites of ergine and ergometrine (analogous to LSD's metabolite 2-oxo-3-hydroxy-LSD).

== Chemistry ==
=== Constituents ===
Morning glory seeds contain a variety of different constituents, and the alkaloids vary depending on the species. The total alkaloid percentages are 0.3% (3 mg/g) in Argyreia nervosa, 0.06% (0.6 mg/g) in Ipomoea tricolor, and 0.012% (0.12 mg/g) in Ipomoea corymbosa. However, a subsequent study reported even higher total alkaloid percentages in Argyreia nervosa of 0.5 to 0.9% (5–9 mg/g). Based on the preceding, a quantity of approximately 8.7 grams of Ipomoea tricolor seeds (or about 400 seeds in total) would contain 5 mg of alkaloids on average.

Alkaloids found in morning glory seeds specifically include the lysergamides ergine (LSA), isoergine (iso-LSA), lysergic acid hydroxyethylamide (LSH), isolysergic acid hydroxyethylamide (iso-LSH), and ergometrine (ergonovine); the ergoline lysergol; and the clavines chanoclavine, elymoclavine, and penniclavine. LSH and iso-LSH are chemically unstable and easily hydrolyze into ergine and isoergine, respectively. Other minor or trace alkaloids in morning glory seeds include agroclavine, chanoclavine II, setoclavine, isosetoclavine, festuclavine, molliclavine, lysergene, isolysergol, ergometrinine, ergosine, ergosinine, and cycloclavine, among others. Ergotamine, a major alkaloid in ergot, is not found in morning glories. Lysergol is found in Ipomoea corymbosa but not in Ipomoea tricolor, while ergometrine is found in Ipomoea tricolor but not in Ipomoea corymbosa. Methylergometrine (methylergonovine), once thought to be a synthetic compound, has since been detected in Argyreia nervosa seeds.

The most major constituents in morning glory seeds in terms of total alkaloid content are ergine (5–58%), isoergine (8–35%), ergometrine (8%), elymoclavine (4–8%), chanoclavine (3–8%), LSH (6%), iso-LSH (4%), and lysergol (4%). However, LSH and iso-LSH may actually be present in morning glory seeds in higher amounts but readily degrade into ergine and isoergine due to their instability, including as a result of chemical analysis. Fresher morning glory seeds may contain more LSH (and iso-LSH) than older seeds.

Constituents of morning glory seeds like ergine are sensitive to light similarly to LSD and light exposure can cause them to epimerize as well as degrade into inactive lumi-LSD-like compounds. As such, storage conditions can influence the alkaloid compositions of morning glory seeds. Morning glory seeds may lose potency with time, presumably due to degradation of their constituents.

Ergine differs from LSD in chemical structure only by the presence of two ethyl substitutions on the amide in LSD. LSD and numerous other psychedelic lysergamides are derivatives of ergine, which is the parent structure of the family.

Chemical structures of selected morning glory constituents and LSD
Ergine (LSA)

Isoergine (iso-LSA)

LSH

Iso-LSH

Ergometrine

Lysergol

Elymoclavine

Chanoclavine

LSD

=== Extraction ===
The extraction of ergoline alkaloids like ergine from morning glory seeds has been described.

=== Precursor source ===
Various psychedelic chemists and researchers, including Michael Hollingshead, Alexander Shulgin, Michael Valentine Smith, and Uncle Fester, have described ergine derived from morning glory seeds as being theoretically employable as a viable precursor in the chemical synthesis of LSD. A recipe that claimed to convert the ergine in morning glory seeds into LSD was provided by William Powell in The Anarchist Cookbook (1971). However, the procedure was merely an extraction of ergine and it does not actually produce LSD. It has been claimed in the mid-2020s that morning glory seeds can be chemically modified to produce theoretical lysergamides with more LSD-like psychedelic effects and greatly reduced side effects, but such claims are controversial and have not been formally evaluated or substantiated as of present.

== History ==
Statue of Xōchipilli ("Prince of Flowers"), a 16th-century Aztec statue depicting ololiúqui and several other hallucinogens.

The Aztecs and other indigenous peoples used ololiúqui (Ipomoea corymbosa) and tlitliltzin (Ipomoea tricolor) as entheogens and in traditional medicine for thousands of years in pre-Columbian times. This was first observed and described by Spanish explorers in the 1500s, for instance in the Florentine Codex of Bernardino de Sahagún. Ololiúqui was identified as Ipomoea corymbosa in seed form by Manuel Urbina in 1897 and in plant form by Blas Pablo Reko and Richard Evans Schultes in 1938, with their findings published in 1941. Humphry Osmond evaluated and described the hallucinogenic effects of Ipomoea corymbosa seeds via self-experimentation in 1955. A few other groups, including Reko, failed to find activity of the seeds, likely due to factors such as insufficient dose and/or consumption of whole rather than ground seeds. Use of Ipomoea tricolor as an entheogen by indigenous Mexican peoples was described by Thomas MacDougall in 1960 and it was soon identified as the historical tlitliltzin. The Central Intelligence Agency (CIA) investigated morning glory seeds under Project MKUltra in the 1950s.

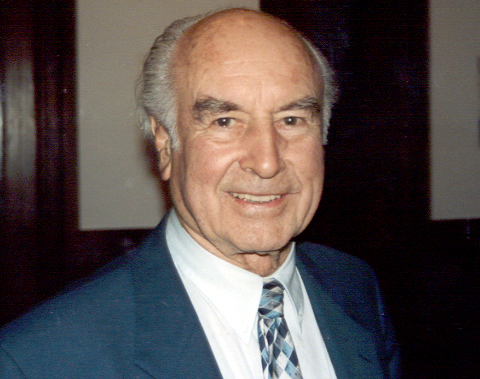
Albert Hofmann (shown in 1993), who discovered LSD and its psychedelic effects and later discovered ergine and other alkaloids in morning glories in 1960.

Ergine and isoergine were first synthesized via hydrolysis of ergot alkaloids and described in the 1930s. Albert Hofmann discovered the psychoactive and hallucinogenic effects of pure ergine and isoergine in 1947, following his serendipitous discovery of the psychedelic effects of LSD in 1943. At the time, ergine and isoergine were known only as synthetic analogues of LSD. However, these compounds were subsequently found to be naturally occurring via isolation from Ipomoea corymbosa and Ipomoea tricolor by Hofmann and Hans Tscherter in 1960, using materials obtained and provided by R. Gordon Wasson in 1959, and along with other alkaloids, were regarded as the active constituents responsible for the effects of morning glory seeds. There was initially skepticism about their discovery of LSD-related alkaloids in morning glory seeds, with critics proposing that the results were due to contamination in his laboratory, but the findings were soon confirmed by other researchers. High levels of ergine, isoergine, and other alkaloids were discovered and reported in Argyreia nervosa seeds by John W. Hylin and Donald P. Watson in 1965. Unlike other morning glory species, there is no known history of indigenous use of Argyreia nervosa for entheogenic purposes. However, it does have a known history of use in traditional Indian Ayurvedic medicine.

Upon the discovery of ergolines in morning glories, it was assumed that these compounds might be produced by symbiotic fungi, analogously to the case of ergot infecting grasses. However, researchers at the time were unable to find evidence of this and it was concluded that the plants themselves produce the alkaloids. It was not until 2004 that it was finally shown that fungicides could eliminate the ergoline alkaloids in Ipomoea asarifolia, suggesting that the ergoline alkaloids in morning glories are in fact produced by symbiotic fungi. The fungi were directly detected in four morning glory species in 2007 and were found to be closely related to Clavicipitaceae. The genus was named Periglandula and was placed within Clavicipitaceae in 2011, with identification of the species Periglandula ipomoeae and Periglandula turbinae at that time. In 2025, a third species, Periglandula clandestina, was described as well. The symbiotic fungus in Argyreia nervosa remains to be fully characterized and named.

Shortly after Hofmann published his findings of LSD-like compounds in morning glory seeds, they started being used recreationally by hippies and the counterculture in the United States and Europe in the early 1960s. Subsequently, use declined after peaking in the late 1960s or early 1970s, but there has been a resurgence in their recreational use as of the 2000s. Pure ergine was encountered as a limitedly used novel designer drug in Europe in 2008. Some indigenous Mexican peoples such as the Zapotec and Mazatec continue to use morning glory seeds as entheogens into modern times. Ipomoea carnea (borrachero, matacabra) is also used as an entheogen in Ecuador.

== Society and culture ==
=== Recreational use ===
Morning glory seeds such as those of Ipomoea tricolor are sold over-the-counter in many retail stores, and teenagers, young adults, and others frequently use the seeds for recreational purposes due to the inexpensiveness, lack of legal restrictions, and widespread availability. Some stores have consequently pulled morning glory seeds from their shelves. Though used recreationally, such use of morning glory seeds has never been extensive, and has been limited by the fact that the seeds taste very bad and often produce pronounced gastrointestinal side effects. They are frequently used as a substitute for other hallucinogens like LSD, and are known to have had the colloquial name "poor man's acid", but reports are mixed in terms of their desirability as a substitute. Ipomoea tricolor and Argyreia nervosa seeds are widely available commercially, whereas Ipomoea corymbosa seeds are not generally available, although they may be sold by some specialty growers. Besides retail stores, morning glory seeds are commonly sold by online vendors and head shops. There have reportedly been occasions in which morning glory seeds have been treated with LSD, with the intent of using morning glory seeds as masking for LSD, but this can be easily detected via chemical analysis.

=== Religious use ===
Along with various other psychedelic drugs, morning glory seeds have been used and/or advocated as entheogens for religious purposes by various psychedelic churches. These groups have specifically included the Church of the Tree of Life, the Church of the North American Shamans, the Neo-American Church (founded at "Morning Glory Lodge"), and the Temple of the True Inner Light.

=== Notable individuals ===
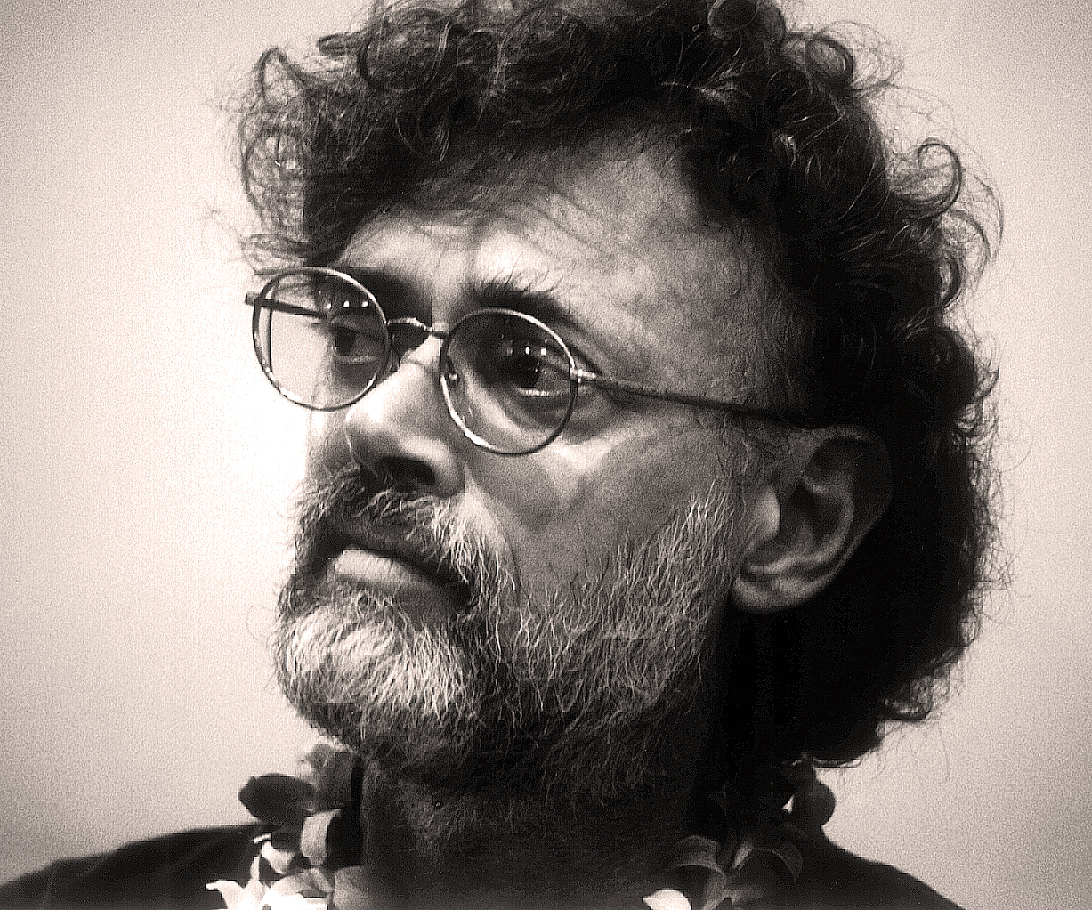
Terence McKenna's first psychedelic experience was with morning glory seeds as a teenager.

Notable individuals who have described their psychedelic experiences with morning glory seeds include Humphry Osmond, Albert Hofmann, Aldous Huxley and his wife Laura Huxley, Oliver Sacks, Jonathan Ott, Terence McKenna, Dennis McKenna, Hamilton Morris, Jim DeKorne, Keeper Trout, Stanley Krippner, and Robert Bashlow. Albert Hofmann experimented with extracts of morning glory seeds and said that "there was a very strange sense of voidness. In this Void, everything loses its meaning. It is a very mystical experience." Jonathan Ott personally regarded morning glory seeds as a "poor" substitute for LSD. Terence McKenna's first psychedelic experience was with morning glory seeds when he was a teenager in the 1960s. He declined to call them "satisfying", but said that they "showed [him] that there was something there worth pursuing". On the other hand, McKenna spoke highly of Argyreia nervosa seeds and referred to them as "Woodrose LSD".

=== Legal status ===
Morning glories are not legally controlled in much of the world. Countries that have bans on use and/or possession of specific morning glories, most typically but not limited to Argyreia nervosa, Ipomoea tricolor, and/or Ipomoea corymbosa, include Australia, Italy, Poland, Romania, Russia, and the United Kingdom. Romania banned Argyreia nervosa and Ipomoea corymbosa but not Ipomoea tricolor due to taxonomic complexities with this particular species and its legitimate horticultural use. Though not controlled in the United States, certain morning glories have been banned in individual states, including Arizona and Louisiana. Use of specific morning glories in food is explicitly banned in some countries, including Australia, Belgium, Denmark, Germany, and New Zealand.

Extracting or isolating active constituents of morning glory seeds that are controlled substances such as ergine may be illegal even though the seeds themselves may be legal. Ergine is a Schedule III controlled substance as a "sedative" and precursor of LSD in the United States. It is also a controlled substance in Brazil, France, Germany, Italy, New Zealand, Switzerland, Turkey, and the United Kingdom (Class A). Conversely, the drug is not a controlled substance in Canada. Lysergic acid hydroxyethylamide (LSH) is a controlled substance in France. Ergometrine (ergonovine) is a controlled substance, often as a precursor of LSD, under the United Nations and in Australia, Brazil, Canada, the European Union, Japan, the United Kingdom, and the United States.

== Research ==
=== Headache disorders ===
Psychedelics such as LSD and psilocybin have attracted interest for the prevention and treatment of severe headaches such as migraines and cluster headaches based on anecdotal reports. People with such headaches sometimes self-medicate with morning glory seeds as a more accessible and legal alternative to other psychedelics. Usually low doses are taken, for instance less than 25 seeds or up to 50 seeds in the case of Ipomoea tricolor. While reportedly helpful, they have anecdotally been regarded as not being as effective as LSD or psilocybin for such purposes. In addition, they are limited by highly variable alkaloid contents within seeds, with some seeds containing no active alkaloids at all. Findings of headache improvement are highly preliminary and more research is needed to properly substantiate their effectiveness.

== See also ==
- Morning glory
- Convolvulaceae
- Aztec use of entheogens § Ololiuqui and tlitliltzin
- List of psychedelic drugs
- List of psychoactive plants
- List of entheogens
