= Teotlaqualli =

Combination of
- Ololiuhqui: Serotonergic psychedelic; Hallucinogen
- Picietl: Nicotinic acetylcholine receptor agonist
- Poisonous animals: Unknown

Clinical data
- Other names: Teotlacualli; Teopatli; Unción abominabl e; Tinta; Comida divina; Time divina; Betún divino; Betún del dios
- Routes of administration: Transdermal (paste)
- ATC code: None

Teotlaqualli, meaning "divine food" and also known as teopatli ("divine medicine") among other names, is a hallucinogen that was used by the Aztecs in the pre-Columbian era. It was made from a combination of ololiuhqui (Ipomoea corymbosa; a morning glory), picietl (Nicotiana rustica; Aztec tobacco), and the ashes of poisonous animals such as spiders, scorpions, and snakes. Ipomoea corymbosa contains serotonergic psychedelics like ergine and isoergine, while Nicotiana rustica contains very high concentrations of nicotine as well as harmala alkaloids. Both Ipomoea corymbosa and Nicotiana rustica are known to be or have been hallucinogenic. The full contents of the drug are unknown.

Teotlaqualli was a black unguent or paste that was applied to the skin and was absorbed transdermally. It was used by Aztec priests and healers, as well as on some occasions by Aztec emperors and even soldiers. It was believed that the drug eliminated fear and produced a proper mental state for serving the gods. The drug was also used as a medicine to treat various ailments. It is thought that teotlaqualli may explain the dark coloration of some Aztec gods as shown in the codices. The Aztecs also offered teotlaqualli to the gods as food. European colonialists believed teotlaqualli to be a form of witchcraft that caused its users to turn into witches or demons and to see and speak to the devil.

Teotlaqualli was described by Fray Diego Durán in his book Historia de las Indias de Nueva España e Islas de Tierra Firme (completed in 1581 but not published for centuries later) as well as by other European colonialists such as Hernándo Ruiz de Alarcón (published in 1629). Jan G. R. Elferink extensively reviewed teotlaqualli in his 1999 paper Teotlaqualli: The Psychoactive Food of the Gods.

== See also ==
- Aztec use of entheogens
- List of substances used in rituals
- Morning glory (drug)
- Ayahuasca
