= Lysergic acid hydroxyethylamide =

Chemical compound

LSH

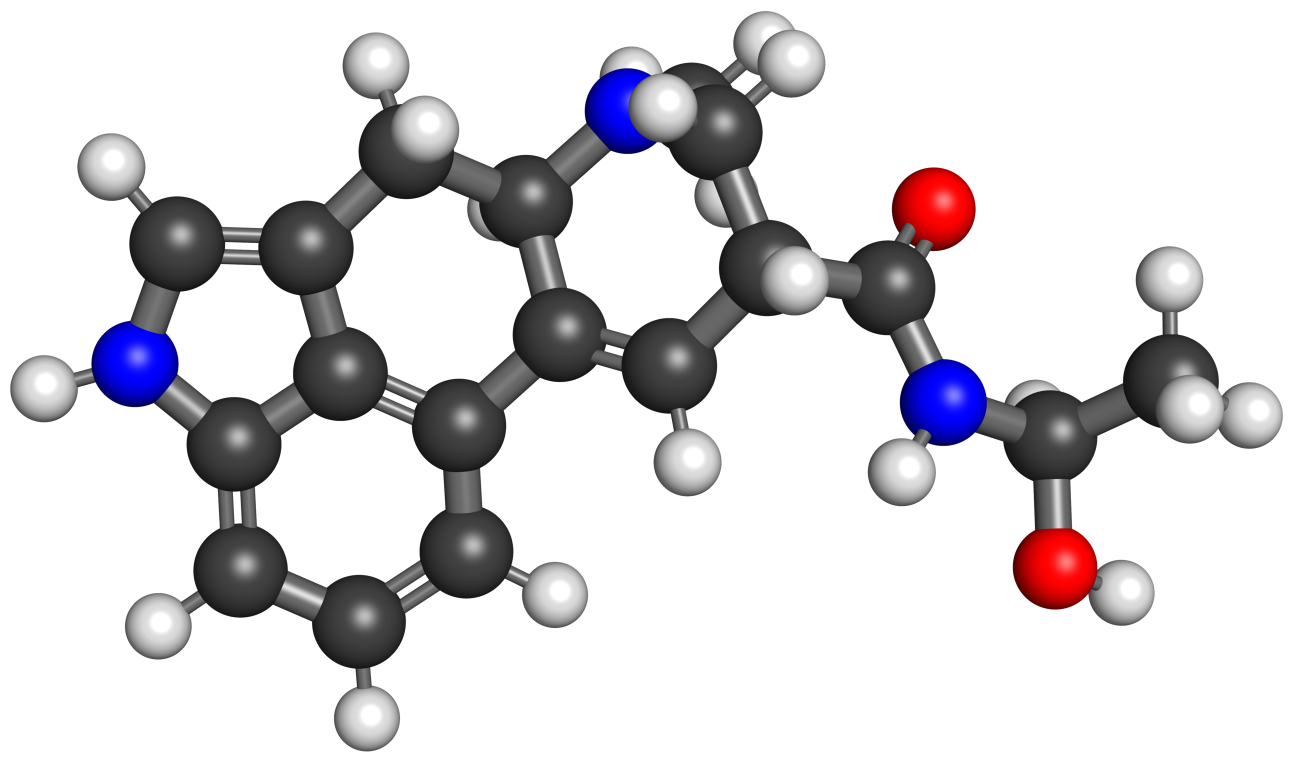

Clinical data
- Other names: LAH; LSH; Lysergic acid N-(α-hydroxyethyl)amide; Lysergic acid α-hydroxyethylamide; Lysergic acid methyl carbinolamide; N-(1-Hydroxyethyl)lysergamide; N(HOE)-LA; 9,10-Didehydro-N-(1-hydroxyethyl)-6-methylergoline-8-carboxamide
- ATC code: None

Legal status
- Legal status: Illegal in France

Identifiers
- IUPAC name: (6aR,9R)-N-(1-hydroxyethyl)-7-methyl-6,6a,8,9-tetrahydro-4H-indolo[4,3-fg]quinoline-9-carboxamide
- CAS Number: 3343-15-5
- PubChem CID: 134553
- ChemSpider: 27470958
- CompTox Dashboard (EPA): DTXSID10955057
- ECHA InfoCard: 100.020.079

Chemical and physical data
- Formula: C_{18}H_{21}N_{3}O_{2}
- Molar mass: 311.385 g·mol^{−1}
- 3D model (JSmol): Interactive image
- SMILES: CC(NC(=O)[C@H]1CN([C@@H]2CC3=CNC4=CC=CC(=C34)C2=C1)C)O
- InChI: InChI=1S/C18H21N3O2/c1-10(22)20-18(23)12-6-14-13-4-3-5-15-17(13)11(8-19-15)7-16(14)21(2)9-12/h3-6,8,10,12,16,19,22H,7,9H2,1-2H3,(H,20,23)/t10?,12-,16-/m1/s1; Key:WYTJZJPVCDWOOI-WPJLSRQMSA-N

Lysergic acid hydroxyethylamide (LSH or LAH), also known as lysergic acid N-(α-hydroxyethyl)amide or as lysergic acid methyl carbinolamide, is a lysergamide alkaloid related to the psychedelic drug lysergic acid diethylamide (LSD). It is found in ergot species such as Claviceps paspali and Claviceps purpurea and in the seeds of morning glory species which contain symbiotic fungi such as Periglandula ipomoeae and Periglandula clandestina.

== Use and effects ==
According to Albert Hofmann, Alexander Shulgin, and other researchers, LSH might be a psychedelic drug and might contribute to or be substantially responsible for the hallucinogenic effects of morning glory seeds. Relatedly, per Shulgin in his 1997 book TiHKAL (Tryptamines I Have Known and Loved), both ergine (lysergic acid amide; LSA) and isoergine (iso-LSA) are "probably correctly dismissed" as not contributing to the effects of morning glory seeds. However, LSH has not been studied in humans and this hypothesis has not been tested or confirmed. LSH is said to be extremely chemically unstable, rapidly degrading into ergine, and this has made its investigation difficult.

== Pharmacology ==
=== Pharmacodynamics ===
The pharmacology of LSH has been very limitedly studied. It has about 30 to 50% of the potency as ergonovine (ergometrine) as an oxytocic in the isolated guinea pig and rabbit uterus, produces sympathomimetic effects like piloerection, mydriasis, and hyperthermia that are very similar to those of ergine (LSA) in mice and rabbits, and has weak ergotamine-like sympatholytic or antiadrenergic effects but with approximately 200-fold lower potency in comparison. These effects are potentially indicative of LSH having LSD-like activity. However, LSH is not known to have been tested in humans. LSH may simply function as a prodrug of ergine.

== Chemistry ==
The structure of LSH is similar to that of LSD, with the N,N-diethylamide group replaced by an N-(1-hydroxyethyl)amide in D-lysergic acid α-hydroxyethylamide. LSH is also very similar in structure to ergonovine (ergometrine), which is also known as lysergic acid hydroxyisopropylamide.

== Natural occurrence ==
Claviceps paspali and Claviceps purpurea are ergot alkaloid-producing fungi that occur as endophytes or pathogens of grasses. Clavicipitaceous fungi of the genus Periglandula are mutualistically associated with, and vertically inherited among, an estimated 450 species of Convolvulaceae. Some of them produce LSH, with 42 generating ergolines per Eckart Eich's review. The most well-known plant hosts are Ipomoea tricolor ("morning glory"), Turbina corymbosa (coaxihuitl), and Argyreia nervosa (Hawaiian baby woodrose).

The more well-known analogue, ergine (lysergic acid amide; LSA), is more prominent in analytical results because LSH easily decomposes to ergine. Ergine is only present because of the decomposition of LSH (and ergonovine and ergopeptines or their ergopeptam precursors) and is not otherwise generated. A 2016 analysis found that fresher Ipomoea tricolor seeds contained more LSH than the other two batches analyzed.

== History ==
LSH was first described in the scientific literature in 1960. It was isolated from Claviceps paspali.

== Society and culture ==
=== Legal status ===
==== Canada ====
LSH is not a controlled substance in Canada.

==== France ====
LSH is illegal in France.

==== United States ====
LSH is not an explicitly controlled substance in the United States. However, it could be considered a controlled substance under the Federal Analogue Act if intended for human consumption.

== See also ==
- Substituted lysergamide
- Morning glory (drug)
