= Periglandula turbinae =

Scientific classification
- Kingdom: Fungi
- Division: Ascomycota
- Class: Sordariomycetes
- Order: Hypocreales
- Family: Clavicipitaceae
- Genus: Periglandula
- Species: P. turbinae

Binomial name
- Periglandula turbinae U. Steiner, E. Leistner & Schardl

Species of fungus

Periglandula turbinae is a fungus of the genus Periglandula in the family Clavicipitaceae. It is symbiotic with Ipomoea corymbosa and is responsible for the ergoline alkaloids present in the plant like ergine (lysergic acid amide; LSA), which in turn are responsible for the psychedelic and entheogenic effects of Ipomoea corymbosa.

== See also ==
- Periglandula
- Periglandula ipomoeae
- Periglandula clandestina
- Morning glory (drug)
