= Periglandula =

Scientific classification
- Kingdom: Fungi
- Division: Ascomycota
- Class: Sordariomycetes
- Order: Hypocreales
- Family: Clavicipitaceae
- Genus: Periglandula; Steiner et al. 2011

Species
- Periglandula ipomoeae; Periglandula turbinae; Periglandula clandestina

Genus of fungi

Periglandula are a genus of fungi in the family Clavicipitaceae.

== Symbiosis ==
They live as epibionts, in a symbiotic relationship with two species of plant, Ipomoea asarifolia and Ipomoea corymbosa. They are known to produce ergot alkaloids related to lysergic acid such as ergine (lysergic acid amide; LSA), and LSH.

== List of species ==
- Periglandula clandestina
- Periglandula ipomoeae
- Periglandula turbinae

== See also ==
- Clavicipitaceae
- Ergot
- Morning glory (drug)
