= C16H18N2 =

The molecular formula C_{16}H_{18}N_{2} (molar mass: 238.33 g/mol) may refer to:

- Agroclavine
- Cycloclavine
- 1-(2-Diphenyl)piperazine (RA-7)
- Lysergine
- Metapramine
- Nomifensine
