= C16H17N3O =

The molecular formula C_{16}H_{17}N_{3}O may refer to:

- Ergine
- Isoergine
