= Periglandula clandestina =

Scientific classification
- Kingdom: Fungi
- Division: Ascomycota
- Class: Sordariomycetes
- Order: Hypocreales
- Family: Clavicipitaceae
- Genus: Periglandula
- Species: P. clandestina

Binomial name
- Periglandula clandestina Hazel & Panaccione (2025)

Species of fungus

Periglandula clandestina is a fungus of the genus Periglandula. It is symbiotic with the morning glory plant Ipomoea tricolor (the Mexican morning glory). Ipomoea tricolor seeds are hallucinogenic in humans due to the presence of naturally occurring lysergamides or ergot alkaloids like ergine (lysergic acid amide; LSA) and isoergine (isolysergic acid amide; iso-LSA). The lysergamides present in Ipomoea tricolor are produced by Periglandula clandestina that it is symbiotic with rather than by Ipomoea tricolor itself. Periglandula clandestina, isolated from Ipomoea tricolor, was discovered and first described by Corinne Hazel and Daniel Panaccione at West Virginia University in 2025.

P. clandestina was quantified most abundantly in hypocotyls of I. tricolor, with lesser quantities in stems, cotyledons, and leaves. The fungus was not detected in roots, although ergot alkaloids were abundant in all tissues including roots. In each tissue, LAH was the most abundant alkaloid (77% of the measured ergot alkaloids), followed in abundance by ergine and ergonovine. Apart from roots, tissues that had relatively high fungal DNA values also had relatively high ergot alkaloid value

== See also ==
- Periglandula
- Periglandula ipomoeae
- Periglandula turbinae
- Morning glory (drug)
