= Isoergine =

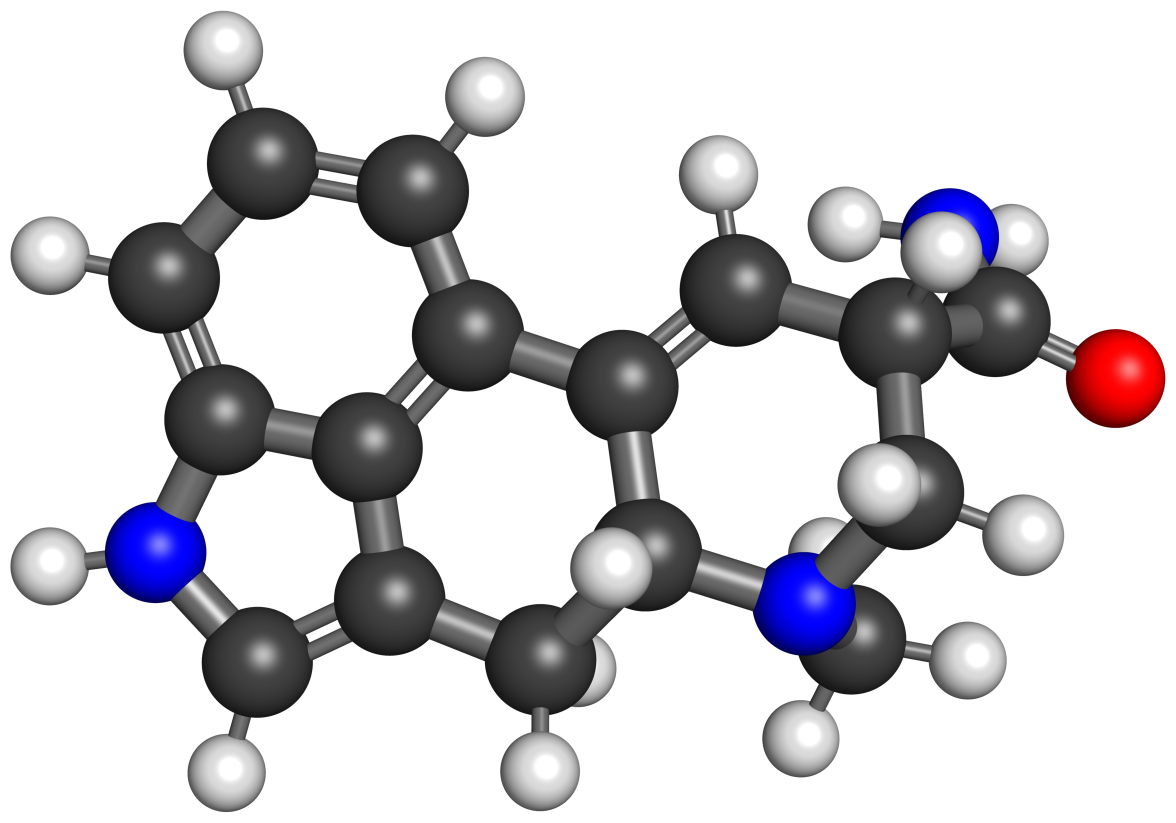

Clinical data
- Other names: Isolysergic acid amide; D-Isolysergic acid amide; Erginine; Isolysergamide; (+)-Isolysergic acid amide; Iso-LA; Iso-LA-819; Iso-LSA; d-Isolysergamide; 6-Methyl-9,10-didehydroergoline-8α-carboxamide
- Routes of administration: Oral
- Drug class: Serotonin receptor modulator; Serotonergic psychedelic; Hallucinogen
- ATC code: None

Identifiers
- IUPAC name: (6aR,9S)-7-methyl-6,6a,8,9-tetrahydro-4H-indolo[4,3-fg]quinoline-9-carboxamide
- CAS Number: 2889-26-1
- PubChem CID: 12309749
- ChemSpider: 32698654
- UNII: 90DGH6Y8E9
- CompTox Dashboard (EPA): DTXSID80183082

Chemical and physical data
- Formula: C_{16}H_{17}N_{3}O
- Molar mass: 267.332 g·mol^{−1}
- 3D model (JSmol): Interactive image
- SMILES: CN1C[C@H](C=C2[C@H]1CC3=CNC4=CC=CC2=C34)C(=O)N
- InChI: InChI=1S/C16H17N3O/c1-19-8-10(16(17)20)5-12-11-3-2-4-13-15(11)9(7-18-13)6-14(12)19/h2-5,7,10,14,18H,6,8H2,1H3,(H2,17,20)/t10-,14+/m0/s1; Key:GENAHGKEFJLNJB-IINYFYTJSA-N

Isoergine, also known as isolysergic acid amide (iso-LSA or iso-LA-819), isolysergamide, or erginine, is a serotonergic psychedelic of the ergoline and lysergamide families related to ergine (lysergic acid amide; LSA) and lysergic acid diethylamide (LSD). It is the epimer of ergine inverted at the 8 position. Along with ergine and other ergolines, isoergine occurs naturally in morning glories. It is thought to be primarily responsible for the hallucinogenic effects of morning glory seeds.

== Use and effects ==
Isoergine occurs naturally in morning glory species, including Ipomoea tricolor (tlitliltzin), Ipomoea corymbosa (ololiuhqui), and Argyreia nervosa (Hawaiian baby woodrose). It has been found to constitute 8 to 35% of total alkaloid content relative to 5 to 58% for ergine.

Albert Hofmann, the discoverer of LSD's psychedelic effects, tried 2 mg isoergine orally and experienced feelings of unreality, detachment from the outside world, feelings of mental emptiness, tiredness, and apathy, though no specific sensory distortions were mentioned. He described its effects as similar to those of ergine, which he had tested at doses of up to 2 mg. Subsequently Heim and colleagues assessed ergine at higher doses of 3 to 6 mg orally and observed toxic-like effects, while isoergine at 2 to 5 mg orally produced notable hallucinogenic effects. The psychedelic effects of isoergine observed in this study included some euphoria, synaesthesia, and altered time perception. However, although hallucinogenic, isoergine's effects have been described as not LSD-like. The presence of hallucinogenic effects of isoergine has been described as quite unusual for an isolysergamide derivative.

It is thought that ergine and isoergine together may account for most or all of the effects of morning glory seeds, with ergine producing intoxication, sedation, and autonomic side effects and isoergine producing hallucinogenic effects. Conversely, other notable constituents, including elymoclavine, lysergol, and chanoclavine, produced no psychoactive or hallucinogenic effects in humans. Ergometrine, which is a minor constituent representing up to 8% of total alkaloids, is known to produce psychedelic effects only in higher amounts (2–10 mg) than those in typical doses of morning glory seeds and hence is thought to not contribute to the effects of the seeds either. Moreover, ergometrine is present in Ipomoea tricolor and Argyreia nervosa but not in Ipomoea corymbosa. Isoergine being responsible for the hallucinogenic effects of morning glory seeds is also supported by animal studies.

According to Alexander Shulgin in his 1997 book TiHKAL (Tryptamines I Have Known and Loved) however, both ergine and isoergine are "probably correctly dismissed" as not contributing to the effects of morning glory seeds. The poorly-stable lysergic acid hydroxyethylamides (LSHs) might alternatively be involved in the psychedelic effects of morning glory seeds per Shulgin.

== Interactions ==
The interactions of isoergine and of morning glory seeds have been discussed.

== Pharmacology ==
=== Pharmacodynamics ===
Isoergine shows affinity for serotonin receptors labeled with serotonin or LSD in rat brain membranes. It has about 10- to 25-fold lower affinity for these receptors than serotonin or LSD and has the same affinity as ergine and iso-LSD (IC_{50} = 100–200 nM for isoergine, 200 nM for ergine and iso-LSD, and 8–10 nM for LSD). No other receptor interaction data are available for isoergine as of 2020. However, computer-predicted receptor affinities are available for ergine/isoergine (stereochemistry not taken into account). The drug is said to have about 4.3% of LSD's antiserotonergic potency in vitro. It is 5- to 33-fold less potent than LSD in producing behavioral changes in the conditioned avoidance test in rodents.

=== Pharmacokinetics ===
The pharmacokinetics of isoergine in rodents have been studied. Isoergine is much less lipophilic than LSD, with log P values of 0.95 and 2.95, respectively. This might influence its pharmacological properties, for instance reducing its blood–brain barrier permeability. However, isoergine showed a similar ratio of brain-to-plasma levels as LSD in rodents.

== Chemistry ==
=== Derivatives ===
Derivatives of isoergine include isolysergic acid diethylamide (iso-LSD), isolysergic acid hydroxyethylamide (iso-LSH), and ergometrinine (isoergometrine; isolysergic acid propanolamide), among others. With the apparent exception of isoergine, isolysergamides, such as iso-LSD, have been found to be inactive as psychedelics in humans.

== History ==
Isoergine was first identified by Sidney Smith and Geoffrey Timmis in 1936 via hydrolysis of ergot alkaloids. This followed the identification of ergine in the same way in 1932. Isoergine was first synthesized by Albert Hofmann and colleagues by 1949. Subsequently, it was isolated by Hofmann and colleagues in morning glory seeds in 1960. The psychoactive effects of isoergine were first described by Hofmann in 1963. Heim and colleagues more clearly substantiated the hallucinogenic effects of isoergine and its role in producing the psychedelic effects of morning glory seeds in 1968.

== Society and culture ==
=== Legal status ===
==== Canada ====
Isoergine is not a controlled substance in Canada as of 2025.

==== United States ====
Isoergine is not an explicitly controlled substance in the United States. However, it could be considered a controlled substance under the Federal Analogue Act if intended for human consumption.

== See also ==
- Substituted lysergamide
- Ergine (lysergic acid amide; LSA; lysergamide)
- Morning glory (drug)
- Aztec use of entheogens § Ololiuqui and Tlitliltzin
- List of entheogens
- List of psychoactive plants
