= Periglandula ipomoeae =

Scientific classification
- Kingdom: Fungi
- Division: Ascomycota
- Class: Sordariomycetes
- Order: Hypocreales
- Family: Clavicipitaceae
- Genus: Periglandula
- Species: P. ipomoeae

Binomial name
- Periglandula ipomoeae U.Steiner, E.Leistner & Schardl (2011)

Species of fungus

Periglandula ipomoeae is a fungus of the genus Periglandula in the family Clavicipitaceae.

== Symbiosis ==
Ipomoea asarifolia, and Ipomoea tricolor seeds contains LSA and LSH among other alkaloids, due to the presence of the symbiotic fungus Periglandula ipomoeae, which lives symbiotically with them as an epibiont and produces these compounds

== See also ==
- Periglandula
- Periglandula clandestina
- Periglandula turbinae
- Morning glory (drug)
