= Lysergol =

Clinical data
- Other names: LOL; 9,10-Didehydro-6-methyl-8β-hydroxymethylergoline; 6-Methyl-9,10-didehydroergolin-8β-yl)methanol
- Drug class: Serotonin receptor modulator; Serotonin 5-HT_{2A} receptor agonist
- ATC code: None

Identifiers
- IUPAC name: [(6aR,9R)-7-methyl-4,6,6a,7,8,9-hexahydroindolo[4,3-fg]quinolin-9-yl]methanol
- CAS Number: 1413-67-8
- PubChem CID: 14987
- IUPHAR/BPS: 123
- ChemSpider: 14267
- UNII: NTR684Z1AZ
- ChEBI: CHEBI:60528
- ChEMBL: ChEMBL39947
- CompTox Dashboard (EPA): DTXSID40975627
- ECHA InfoCard: 100.009.113

Chemical and physical data
- Formula: C_{16}H_{18}N_{2}O
- Molar mass: 254.333 g·mol^{−1}
- 3D model (JSmol): Interactive image
- SMILES: OC[C@@H]3/C=C2/c4cccc1c4c(c[nH]1)C[C@H]2N(C3)C
- InChI: InChI=1S/C16H18N2O/c1-18-8-10(9-19)5-13-12-3-2-4-14-16(12)11(7-17-14)6-15(13)18/h2-5,7,10,15,17,19H,6,8-9H2,1H3/t10-,15-/m1/s1; Key:BIXJFIJYBLJTMK-MEBBXXQBSA-N

Lysergol, also known as LOL (from Lysergol) or as 9,10-didehydro-6-methyl-8β-hydroxymethylergoline, is an alkaloid of the ergoline family that occurs as a minor constituent in some species of fungi (most within Claviceps), and in the morning glory family of flowering plants, including the hallucinogenic seeds of Rivea corymbosa (ololiuhqui), Argyreia nervosa (Hawaiian baby woodrose), and Ipomoea violacea.

== Use and effects ==
In contrast to LSD and other lysergamides, lysergol is non-hallucinogenic in humans and is described as not contributing to the hallucinogenic effects of morning glory seeds. It was inactive as a psychedelic drug at doses of 2 to 8 mg orally, up to more than 100 times the effective dose of LSD, but did produce light sedative-like effects at the 8 mg dose.

== Pharmacology ==
=== Pharmacodynamics ===
The binding of lysergol, as well as of isolysergol, to the serotonin 5-HT_{1A}, 5-HT_{2A}, 5-HT_{2B}, and 5-HT_{2C} receptors has been described. It is an agonist of the serotonin 5-HT_{2A} receptor and α_{1}-adrenergic receptor.

== Chemistry ==
=== Synthesis ===
Lysergol can be synthesised using a tandem reaction to construct the piperidine skeleton and a rhodium-catalyzed [3 + 2] annulation in the late-stage indole formation.

=== Analogues ===
Analogues of lysergol include lysergine, lysergic acid, and descarboxylysergic acid, among others.

== Society and culture ==
=== Legal status ===
Lysergol is not a controlled substance in the United States. Its possession and sale is also legal under the U.S. Federal Analog Act because it does not have a known pharmacological action or a precursor relationship to LSD, which is a controlled substance. However, lysergol is an intermediate in the manufacture of some ergoloid medicines (e.g., nicergoline).

== See also ==
- Substituted ergoline
- Morning glory (drug)
