= Claviceps paspali =

Scientific classification
- Kingdom: Fungi
- Division: Ascomycota
- Class: Sordariomycetes
- Order: Hypocreales
- Family: Clavicipitaceae
- Genus: Claviceps
- Species: C. paspali

Binomial name
- Claviceps paspali F. Stevens & J.G. Hall

Species of fungus

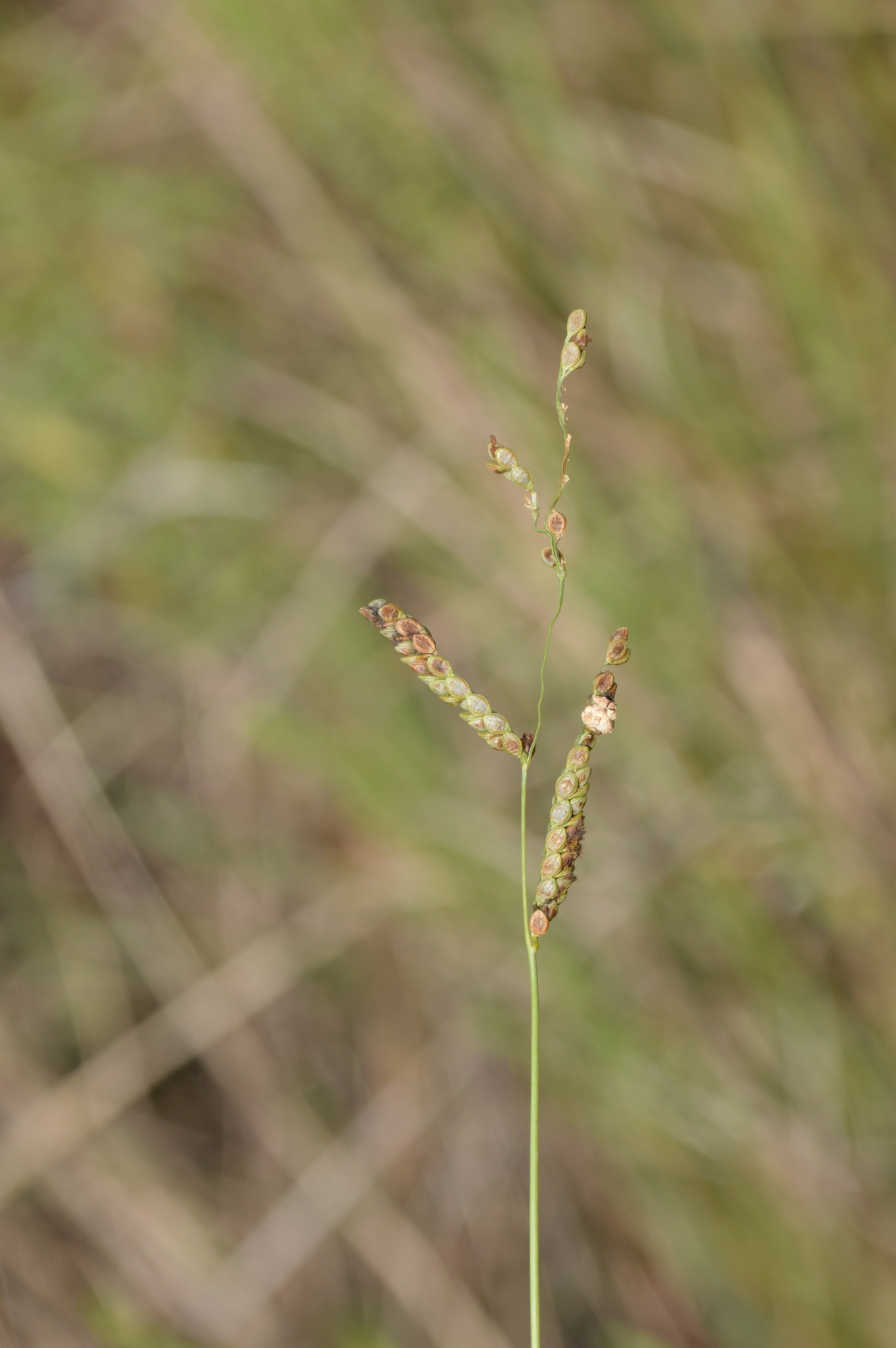
Paspalum ergot (Claviceps paspali)

Claviceps paspali is a fungus of the genus Claviceps (ergot) and family Clavicipitaceae. Along with the better-known Claviceps purpurea, it is one of the Claviceps species that has the capacity to produce psychedelic lysergamides such as ergine (lysergic acid amide; LSA) and isoergine.

Claviceps paspali infects wild grasses and could be found on the common grass Paspalum. Like Claviceps africana, Claviceps paspali also secretes honeydew which is consumed by bees. The bees then create a honey called fic'e (Paraguayan Makai Indian language), which is infused with secretions from the plants and has a pungent aroma. If consumed in high amounts, the honey can cause drunkenness, dizziness and even death.
