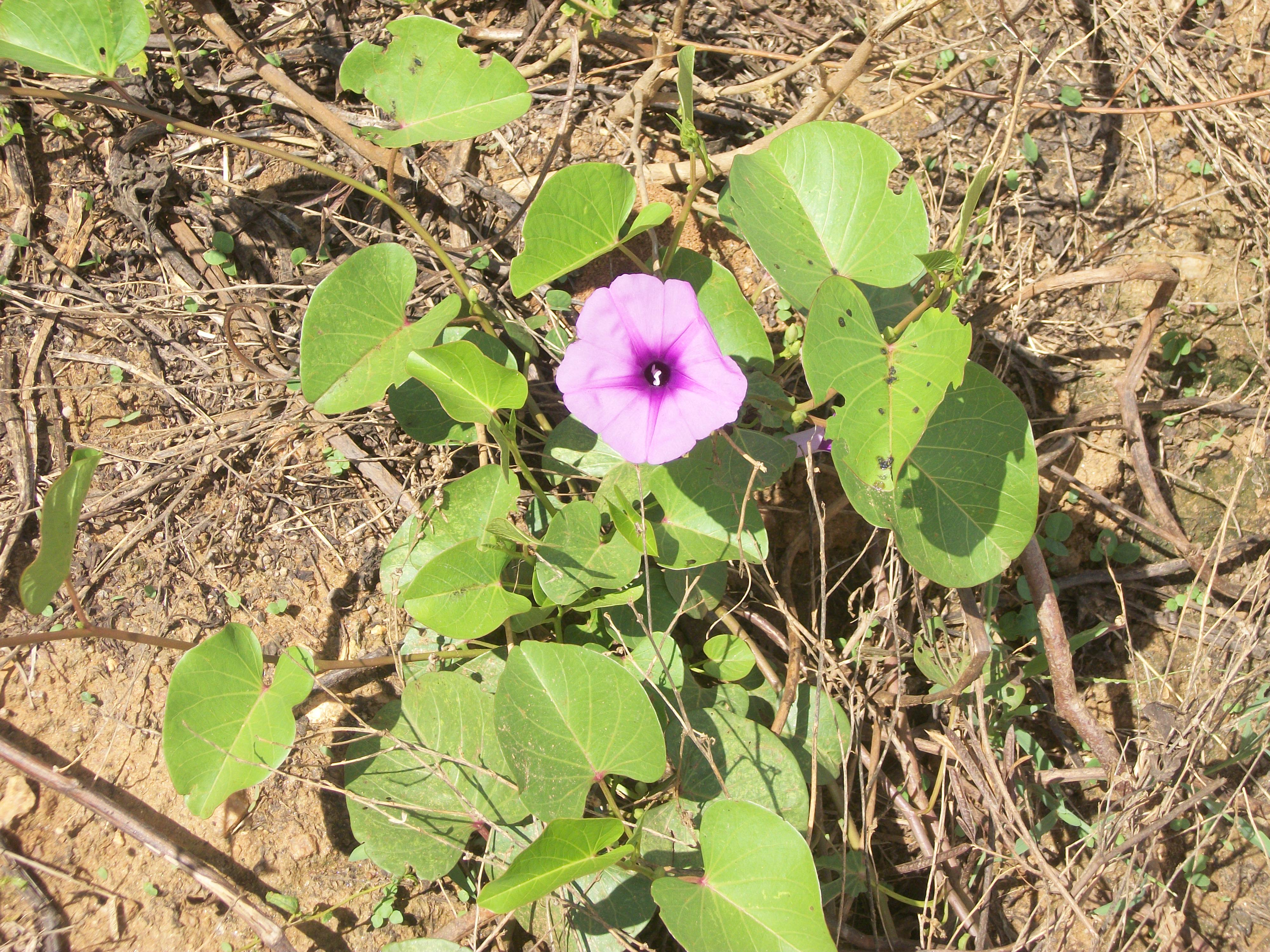

Scientific classification
- Kingdom: Plantae
- Clade: Tracheophytes
- Clade: Angiosperms
- Clade: Eudicots
- Clade: Asterids
- Order: Solanales
- Family: Convolvulaceae
- Genus: Ipomoea
- Species: I. asarifolia

Binomial name
- Ipomoea asarifolia (Desr.) Roem. & Schult.

= Ipomoea asarifolia =

Species of flowering plant

Ipomoea asarifolia, known as the ginger-leaf morning-glory, is a species of plant in the family Convolvulaceae, of the genus Ipomoea. It is a scrambling subshrub native to the tropical Americas, tropical Africa, India, Sri Lanka, Indochina, Java, and the Lesser Sunda Islands.

== Chemistry, toxicology, and pharmacology ==
Ipomoea asarifolia lives symbiotically with the fungus Periglandula ipomoeae, which biosynthesizes ergoline alkaloids such as D-lysergic acid α-hyroxyethylamide as well as indole diterpene alkaloids. Periglandula ipomoeae was found on the following six organs: young leaves, mature leaves, flower buds, mature flowers, young seeds, and mature seeds.

Ipomoea asarifolia causes a tremorgenic syndrome if ingested by Capra hircus (domestic goat), but the reason for this is unknown. The effect has been attributed to tremorgenic phytotoxins or mycotoxins. In one study, dried samples of Ipomoea asarifolia were found to contain swainsonine, but the concentration was less than 0.001%.

== See also ==
- Morning glory (drug)
