= Penniclavine =

Names
- IUPAC name 8β-(Hydroxymethyl)-6-methyl-9,10-didehydroergolin-8α-ol
- Systematic IUPAC name (6aR,9S)-9-(Hydroxymethyl)-7-methyl-4,6,6a,7,8,9-hexahydroindolo[4,3-fg]quinolin-9-ol

Identifiers
CAS Number	519-13-1
3D model (JSmol)	Interactive image
ChemSpider	103117
PubChem CID	115247
UNII	28Z5OY3SFA
CompTox Dashboard (EPA)	DTXSID301020153
- InChI: InChI=1S/C16H18N2O2/c1-18-8-16(20,9-19)6-12-11-3-2-4-13-15(11)10(7-17-13)5-14(12)18/h2-4,6-7,14,17,19-20H,5,8-9H2,1H3/t14-,16+/m1/s1 Key: KCHBNRCSCHMJFD-ZBFHGGJFSA-N; InChI=1/C16H18N2O2/c1-18-8-16(20,9-19)6-12-11-3-2-4-13-15(11)10(7-17-13)5-14(12)18/h2-4,6-7,14,17,19-20H,5,8-9H2,1H3/t14-,16+/m1/s1 Key: KCHBNRCSCHMJFD-ZBFHGGJFBY
- SMILES: OC[C@]3(O)/C=C2/c4cccc1c4c(c[nH]1)C[C@H]2N(C3)C

Properties
Chemical formula	C_{16}H_{18}N_{2}O_{2}
Molar mass	270.332 g·mol^{−1}
- Except where otherwise noted, data are given for materials in their standard state (at 25 °C [77 °F], 100 kPa). Infobox references

Penniclavine is an ergot alkaloid that has been found in morning glory species such as Argyreia nervosa (Hawaiian baby woodrose). It was first described by the 1950s.

== See also ==
- Substituted ergoline
- Morning glory (drug)
