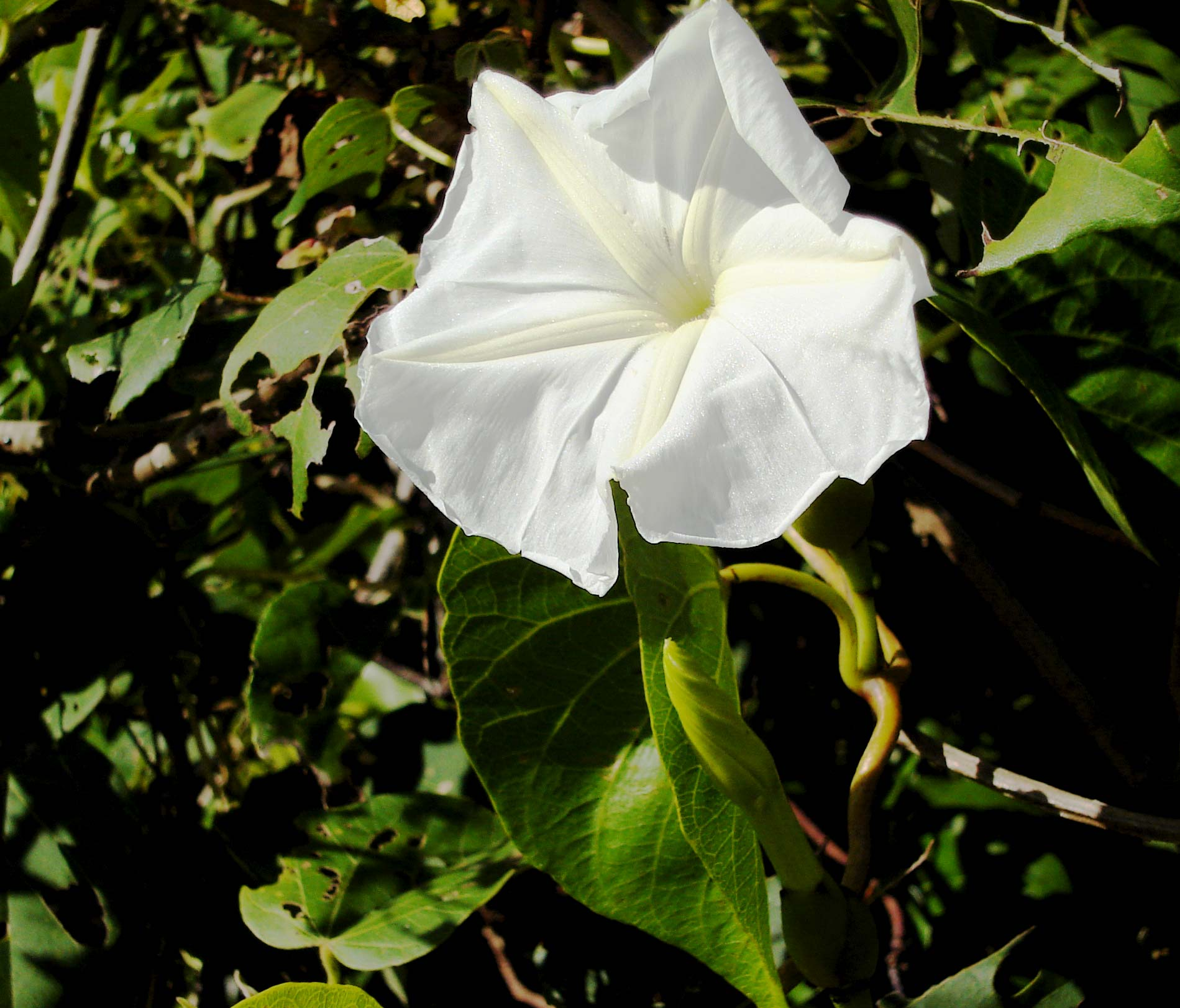

Scientific classification
- Kingdom: Plantae
- Clade: Tracheophytes
- Clade: Angiosperms
- Clade: Eudicots
- Clade: Asterids
- Order: Solanales
- Family: Convolvulaceae
- Genus: Ipomoea
- Species: I. violacea

Binomial name
- Ipomoea violacea L.

= Ipomoea violacea =

Species of flowering plant

Ipomoea violacea is a perennial species of Ipomoea that occurs throughout the world with the exception of the European continent. It is most commonly called beach moonflower or sea moonflower as the flowers open at night.

== Description ==
The corolla of the flower of Ipomoea violacea is white, distinguishing this species from Ipomoea tricolor, commonly called Heavenly Blue. It is sometimes mistaken for the cultivar Pearly Gates, the corolla of which is also white, probably because of its misleading Latin binomial name, Ipomoea violacea, "violacea" meaning purple.

== Comparative taxonomies ==
A comparison of the taxonomy of the two plants shows that they belong to different Subgenera, consequently, Ipomoea violacea should not be used as a synonym for Ipomoea tricolor. In exceptional cases where Ipomoea violacea has to be used as a synonym of Ipomoea tricolor, one must specify the incorrect usage by using the abbreviation 'Auct.' for Auctorum.

Ipomoea violacea:

- Genus: Ipomoea

- Subgenus: Eriospermum

- Section: Erpipomoea

Ipomoea tricolor:

- Genus: Ipomoea

- Subgenus: Quamoclit

- Section: Tricolor

== Constituents and psychoactive effects ==
There has been longstanding confusion between Ipomoea violacea and Ipomoea tricolor. Ipomoea violacea was once a synonym for Ipomoea tricolor, but the two species are now separate. Whereas Ipomoea tricolor contains ergolines such as ergine (LSA) and is hallucinogenic, Ipomoea violacea contains no such alkaloids and is non-psychoactive.
