= Elymoclavine =

Names
- IUPAC name (6-Methyl-8,9-didehydroergolin-8-yl)methanol
- Systematic IUPAC name [(6aR,10aR)-7-Methyl-4,6,6a,7,8,10a-hexahydroindolo[4,3-fg]quinolin-9-yl]methanol

Identifiers
CAS Number	548-43-6
3D model (JSmol)	Interactive image
ChemSpider	389734
ECHA InfoCard	100.008.136
PubChem CID	440904
UNII	5LR46DLO0D
CompTox Dashboard (EPA)	DTXSID70970145
- InChI: InChI=1S/C16H18N2O/c1-18-8-10(9-19)5-13-12-3-2-4-14-16(12)11(7-17-14)6-15(13)18/h2-5,7,13,15,17,19H,6,8-9H2,1H3/t13-,15-/m1/s1 Key: DAVNRFCJMIONPO-UKRRQHHQSA-N; InChI=1/C16H18N2O/c1-18-8-10(9-19)5-13-12-3-2-4-14-16(12)11(7-17-14)6-15(13)18/h2-5,7,13,15,17,19H,6,8-9H2,1H3/t13-,15-/m1/s1 Key: DAVNRFCJMIONPO-UKRRQHHQBW
- SMILES: OCC\2=C\[C@@H]3c4cccc1c4c(c[nH]1)C[C@H]3N(C/2)C

Properties
Chemical formula	C_{16}H_{18}N_{2}O
Molar mass	254.327
- Except where otherwise noted, data are given for materials in their standard state (at 25 °C [77 °F], 100 kPa). Infobox references

Elymoclavine is an ergot alkaloid (ergoline alkaloid). It can be produced from C. fusiformis from Pennisetum typhoideum. It is a precursor in the biosynthesis of D-(+)-lysergic acid. Ergot alkaloids are natural products derived from L-tryptophan. They are often toxic for humans and animals. Despite that they are also well known for their pharmacological activities.

The compound is described as being non-hallucinogenic in humans, instead producing mainly sedative effects, and as not contributing to the psychoactive or hallucinogenic effects of morning glory seeds. The doses employed were not provided.

== Biosynthesis ==
The main building blocks for biosynthesis of elymoclavine are tryptophan (Trp) and DMAPP. DMATrp is obtained after electrophilic substitution followed by addition (Step A below). Then an amine is methylated by an N-methyltransfersase (Step B). Next, the allyl alcohol is oxidized to the diene (Step C). After 1,4-elimination, the diene undergoes an epoxidation (Step D). Then decarboxylation is followed by the 6-member ring formation and epoxide opened to form terminal alcohol (Step E). Obtained chanoclavine gets oxidized to chanoclavine aldehyde (Step F). Then the second 6-member ring forms and agroclavine is obtained after additional reductase (Steps G and H). Finally elymoclavine is generated after an oxidation (Step I). The last step is NADPH-dependent, and it is suggested that cytochrome P450 is the catalyst.

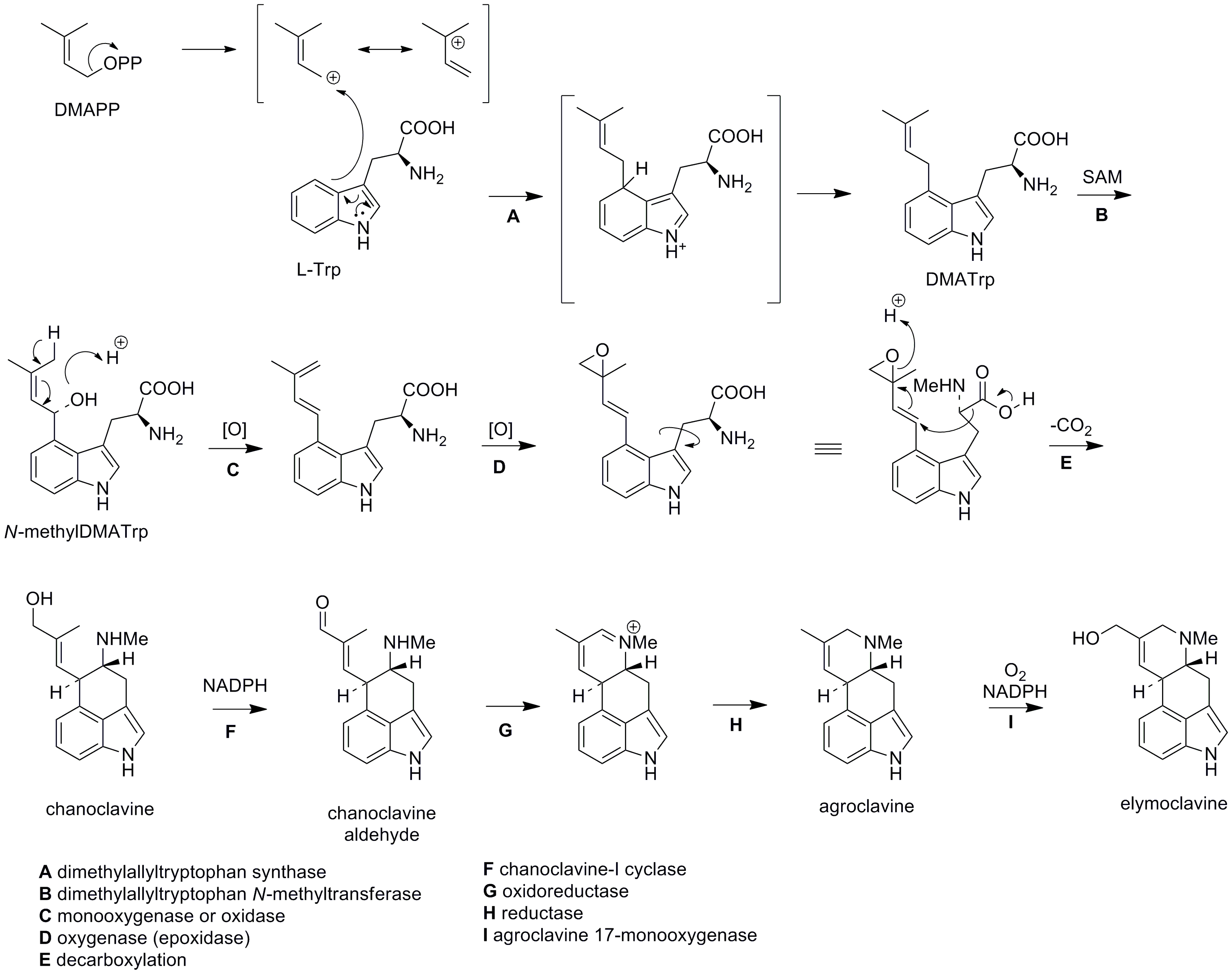

== See also ==
- Substituted ergoline
- Morning glory (drug)
