= Cycloclavine =

Plant alkaloid

Names
- IUPAC name 6,8-Dimethyl-8,10-cycloergoline
- Systematic IUPAC name (1aS,3aR,9bS)-1a,3-Dimethyl-1a,2,3,3a,4,6-hexahydro-1H-cyclopropa[c]indolo[4,3-ef]indole

Identifiers
CAS Number	26057-57-8
3D model (JSmol)	Interactive image
ChemSpider	25991549
PubChem CID	101316916
UNII	XRQ6TJ7KL8
CompTox Dashboard (EPA)	DTXSID701045769
- InChI: InChI=1S/C16H18N2/c1-15-8-16(15)11-4-3-5-12-14(11)10(7-17-12)6-13(16)18(2)9-15/h3-5,7,13,17H,6,8-9H2,1-2H3/t13-,15-,16-/m0/s1 Key: ZWJHDICNUKHUGE-BPUTZDHNSA-N
- SMILES: [H][C@@]12CC3=CNC4=C3C(=CC=C4)[C@]11C[C@]1(C)CN2C

Properties
Chemical formula	C_{16}H_{18}N_{2}
Molar mass	238.334 g·mol^{−1}
- Except where otherwise noted, data are given for materials in their standard state (at 25 °C [77 °F], 100 kPa). Infobox references

Cycloclavine is a cyclopropanated ergot alkaloid. It was first isolated in 1969 from seeds of Ipomoea hildebrandtii. The first total synthesis of (±)-cycloclavine was published in 2008 by Szántay. Further reports came from Wipf and Petronijevic, Cao and Brewer. In 2016, Wipf and McCabe completed an 8-step asymmetric synthesis of (–)-cycloclavine, and in 2018, they expanded this approach toward (+)-cycloclavine and a biological characterization of the binding profile of both enantiomers on 16 brain receptors. Natural (+)- and unnatural (–)-cycloclavine demonstrated significant stereospecificity and unique binding profiles in comparison to LSD (lysergic acid diethylamide), psilocin, and DMT. Differential 5-HT receptor affinities, as well as novel sigma-1 receptor properties, suggest potential future medicinal uses of this unique plant alkaloid.
