= List of purification methods in chemistry =

Purification in a chemical context is the physical separation of a chemical substance of interest from foreign or contaminating substances. Pure results of a successful purification process are termed isolate. The following list of chemical purification methods should not be considered exhaustive.

- Affinity purification purifies proteins by retaining them on a column through their affinity to antibodies, enzymes, or receptors that have been immobilised on the column.
- Filtration is a mechanical method to separate solids from liquids or gases by passing the feed stream through a porous sheet such as a cloth or membrane, which retains the solids and allows the liquid to pass through.
- Centrifugation is a process that uses an electric motor to spin a vessel of fluid at high speed to make heavier components settle to the bottom of the vessel.
- Evaporation removes volatile liquids from non-volatile solutes, which cannot be done through filtration due to the small size of the substances.
- Liquid–liquid extraction removes an impurity or recovers a desired product by dissolving the crude material in a solvent in which other components of the feed material are soluble.
- Crystallization separates a product from a liquid feed stream, often in extremely pure form, by cooling the feed stream or adding precipitants that lower the solubility of the desired product so that it forms crystals. The pure solid crystals are then separated from the remaining liquor by filtration or centrifugation.
- Recrystallization: In analytical and synthetic chemistry work, purchased reagents of doubtful purity may be recrystallised, e.g. dissolved in a very pure solvent, and then crystallized, and the crystals recovered, in order to improve and/or verify their purity.
- Trituration removes highly soluble impurities from usually solid insoluble material by rinsing it with an appropriate solvent.
- Adsorption removes a soluble impurity from a feed stream by trapping it on the surface of a solid material, such as activated carbon, that forms strong non-covalent chemical bonds with the impurity.
- Chromatography employs continuous adsorption and desorption on a packed bed of a solid to purify multiple components of a single feed stream. In a laboratory setting, mixture of dissolved materials are typically fed using a solvent into a column packed with an appropriate adsorbent, and due to different affinities for solvent (moving phase) versus adsorbent (stationary phase) the components in the original mixture pass through the column in the moving phase at different rates, which thus allows to selectively collect desired materials out of the initial mixture.
- Smelting produces metals from raw ore, and involves adding chemicals to the ore and heating it up to the melting point of the metal.
- Refining is used primarily in the petroleum industry, whereby crude oil is heated and separated into stages according to the condensation points of the various elements.
- Distillation, widely used in petroleum refining and in purification of ethanol separates volatile liquids on the basis of their relative volatilities. There are several type of distillation: simple distillation, steam distillation etc.
- Water purification combines a number of methods to produce potable or drinking water.
- Downstream processing refers to purification of chemicals, pharmaceuticals and food ingredients produced by fermentation or synthesized by plant and animal tissues, for example antibiotics, citric acid, vitamin E, and insulin.
- Fractionation refers to a purification strategy in which some relatively inefficient purification method is repeatedly applied to isolate the desired substance in progressively greater purity.
- Electrolysis refers to the breakdown of substances using an electric current. This removes impurities in a substance that an electric current is run through
- Sublimation is the process of changing of any substance (usually on heating) from a solid to a gas (or from gas to a solid) without passing through liquid phase. In terms of purification - material is heated, often under vacuum, and the vapors of the material are then condensed back to a solid on a cooler surface. The process thus in its essence is similar to distillation, however the material which is condensed on the cooler surface then has to be removed mechanically, thus requiring different laboratory equipment.
- Bioleaching is the extraction of metals from their ores through the use of living organisms.

Separation process

From Crystallization

- Plasma-chemical purification...
