= Agroclavine =

Names
- IUPAC name 6,8-Dimethyl-8,9-didehydroergoline
- Systematic IUPAC name (6aR,10aR)-7,9-Dimethyl-4,6,6a,7,8,10a-hexahydroindolo[4,3-fg]quinoline
- Other names 8,9-Didehydro-6,8-dimethylergoline

Identifiers
| CAS Number | 548-42-5 |
| 3D model (JSmol) | Interactive image |
| ChEBI | CHEBI:2519 |
| ChEMBL | ChEMBL449081 |
| ChemSpider | 66176 |
| ECHA InfoCard | 100.008.135 |
| PubChem CID | 73484 |
| UNII | A8SW57GO7T |
| CompTox Dashboard (EPA) | DTXSID10970144 |
- InChI: InChI=1S/C16H18N2/c1-10-6-13-12-4-3-5-14-16(12)11(8-17-14)7-15(13)18(2)9-10/h3-6,8,13,15,17H,7,9H2,1-2H3/t13-,15-/m1/s1 Key: XJOOMMHNYOJWCZ-UKRRQHHQSA-N; InChI=1S/C16H18N2/c1-10-6-13-12-4-3-5-14-16(12)11(8-17-14)7-15(13)18(2)9-10/h3-6,8,13,15,17H,7,9H2,1-2H3/t13-,15-/m1/s1
- SMILES: c2c3c1c(cccc1[nH]2)[C@H]4\C=C(/CN([C@@H]4C3)C)C

Properties
| Chemical formula | C_{16}H_{18}N_{2} |
| Molar mass | 238.334 g·mol^{−1} |
- Except where otherwise noted, data are given for materials in their standard state (at 25 °C [77 °F], 100 kPa). verify (what is ?) Infobox references

Agroclavine belongs to the group of ergot alkaloids, which also includes ergotamine. Historically, the main use of agroclavine was in the synthesis of ergot-based drugs; agroclavine can be oxidized to elymoclavine, which then undergoes further processing.
