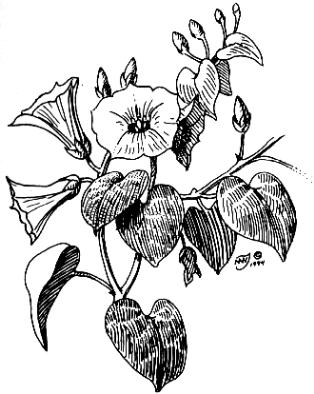

Scientific classification
- Kingdom: Plantae
- Clade: Tracheophytes
- Clade: Angiosperms
- Clade: Eudicots
- Clade: Asterids
- Order: Solanales
- Family: Convolvulaceae
- Genus: Ipomoea
- Species: I. corymbosa

Binomial name
- Ipomoea corymbosa (L.) Roth

Synonyms
- List: Convolvulus corymbosus L.; Convolvulus domingensis Desr.; Convolvulus laevicaulis Willd. ex Roem. & Schult.; Convolvulus multiflorus Kunth; Convolvulus sidaefolius Kunth; Ipomoea antillana Millsp.; Ipomoea domingensis (Desr.) House; Ipomoea sidaefolia (Kunth) Sweet; Legendrea corymbosa (L.) Ooststr.; Legendrea mollissima Webb & Berthel.; Rivea corymbosa (L.) Hallier f.; Turbina corymbosa (L.) Raf.

= Ipomoea corymbosa =

Species of plant

Ipomoea corymbosa (Rivea corymbosa, Turbina corymbosa) is a species of morning glory, native throughout Latin America from Mexico as far south as Peru and widely naturalised elsewhere. Its common names include Christmasvine, Christmaspops, and snakeplant.

== Description and names ==
Known to natives of north and central Mexico by its Nahuatl name, coaxihuitl and by the south eastern natives as xtabentún (in Mayan), it is a perennial woody climbing vine with white flowers, often grown as an ornamental plant. Its flowers secrete copious amount of nectar, and the honey that bees make from it is very clear and aromatic. It also grows in Cuba, where it usually blooms from early December to February. It is considered one of the main honey plants of the island.

This plant is often used for purposes other than recreation, as natives of Mexico consider the flour produced from its seeds (referred to as ololiuhqui, i.e., "round thing") a tool for divination and communion with spirits. Because of the widespread use among native tribes, Colonial rules initially feared ololiuhqui and banned it introducing harsh punishments for users.

Although the spelling ololiuqui has gained wide acceptance and is now the commonest orthography, linguistic evidence indicates that this Nahuatl word is correctly written ololiuhqui.

— R. E. Schultes

== Chemical properties ==
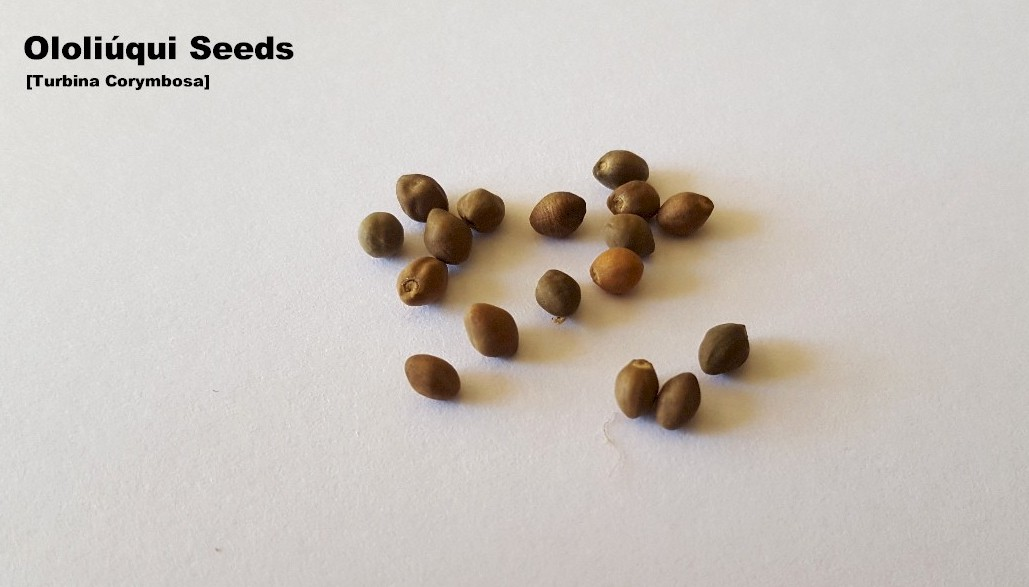
Seeds of Ipomoea corymbosa (Synonyms: Rivea corymbosa and Turbina corymbosa)

The Nahuatl word ololiuhqui means "round thing", and refers to the small, brown, oval seeds of the morning glory, not the plant itself, which is called coaxihuitl ("snake-plant") in Nahuatl, and hiedra, bejuco or quiebraplatos in the Spanish language. The seeds, in Spanish, are sometimes called semilla de la Virgen (seeds of the Virgin Mary). While little of it is known outside of Mexico, its seeds were perhaps the most common psychedelic drug used by the natives.

In 1941, Richard Evans Schultes first identified ololiuhqui as Turbina corymbosa and the chemical composition was first described in 1960 in a paper by Albert Hofmann. The seeds contain ergine (LSA), an ergoline alkaloid which is also present in ergot and is similar in structure to LSD. Ergot may have been part of the Kykeon, the drink which was a component of the Eleusinian Mysteries. The psychedelic properties of Turbina corymbosa and a comparison of the potency of different varieties were studied in the Central Intelligence Agency's MKULTRA Subproject 22 in 1956.

My chemical investigations of Ololiuhqui seeds led to the unexpected discovery that the entheogenic principles of Ololiuhqui are alkaloids, especially lysergic acid amide, which exhibits a very close relationship to lysergic acid diethylamide (=ʟsᴅ). It follows therefrom that ʟsᴅ, which hitherto had been considered to be a synthetic product of the laboratory, actually belongs to the group of sacred Mexican drugs.

— Albert Hofmann, Burg i.L., Switzerland, November 1992

== Distribution ==
This species is an invasive species to the United States, Europe (Spain), and Australia, where it has become more naturalized.

== See also ==
- List of Ipomoea species
- Morning glory (drug)
- Xtabay
- Teotlaqualli
