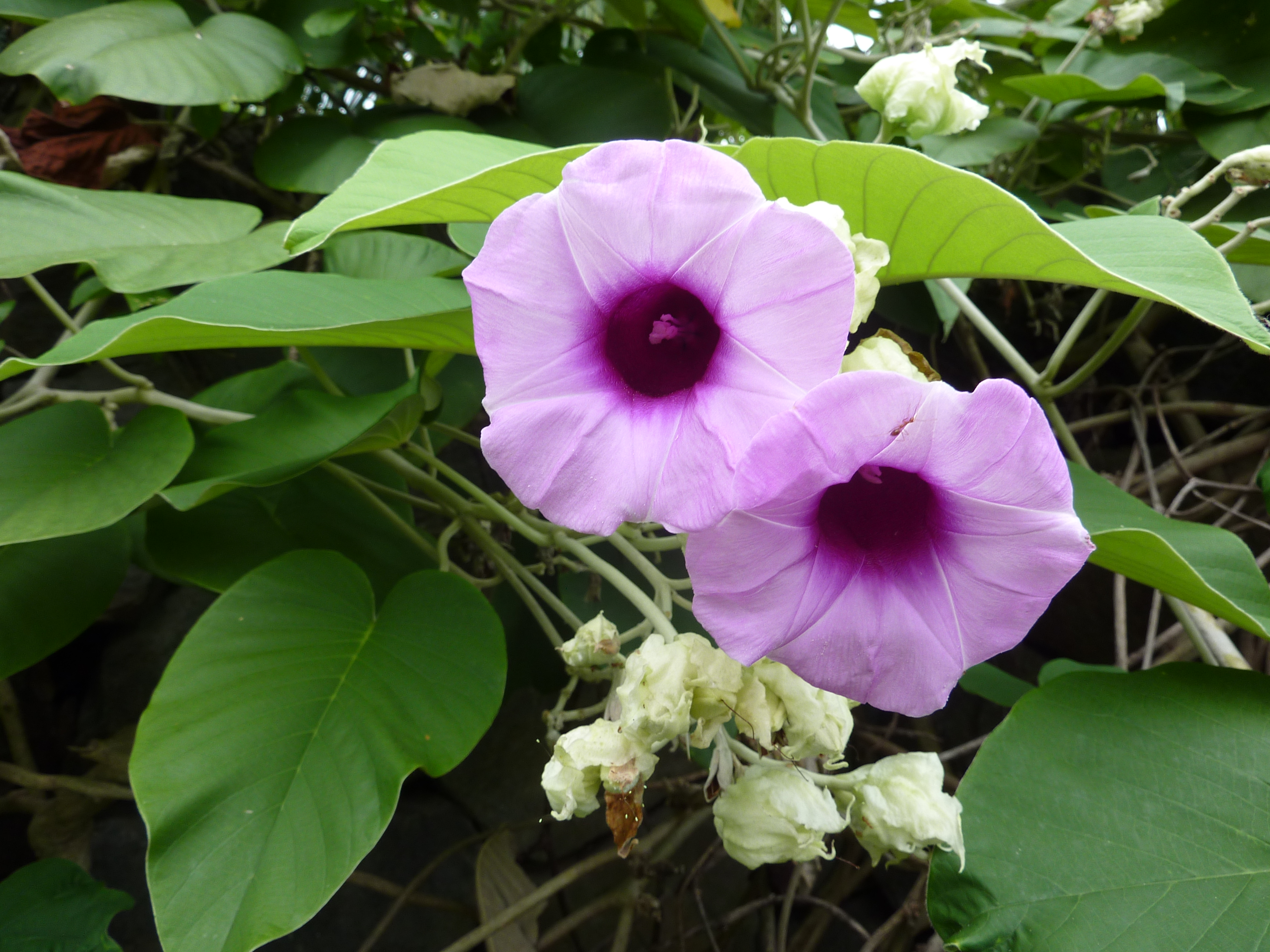
- Flowers (enlarge)

Scientific classification
- Kingdom: Plantae
- Clade: Tracheophytes
- Clade: Angiosperms
- Clade: Eudicots
- Clade: Asterids
- Order: Solanales
- Family: Convolvulaceae
- Genus: Argyreia
- Species: A. nervosa

Binomial name
- Argyreia nervosa (Burm.f.) Bojer

Synonyms
- Convolvulus nervosus Burm.f.; Ipomoea nervosa (Burm.f.) J.R.I.Wood & Scotland; Lettsomia nervosa (Burm.f.) Roxb.; Rivea nervosa (Burm.f.) Hallier f.; Argyreia speciosa (L.f.) Sweet; Convolvulus speciosus L.f.; Ipomoea speciosa (L.f.) Pers.; Ipomoea valerii Standl. & L.O.Williams; Samudra speciosa (L.f.) Raf.

= Argyreia nervosa =

Species of plant

Argyreia nervosa is a perennial climbing vine native to the Indian subcontinent and introduced to numerous areas worldwide, including Hawaii, Africa, and the Caribbean. Though it can be invasive, it is often prized for its aesthetic and medicinal value. Common names include elephant creeper, woolly morning glory and Hawaiian baby woodrose. Its seeds are known for their powerful entheogenic properties, greater or similar to those of Ipomoea species, with users reporting significant psychedelic and spiritual experiences. The two botanical varieties are Argyreia nervosa var. nervosa described here, and Argyreia nervosa var. speciosa, the roots of which are used in Ayurvedic medicine.

Argyreia nervosa contains various ergoline alkaloids such as ergine (lysergic acid amide; LSA) and isoergine (isolysergic acid amide; iso-LSA). A study reported stereoisomers of ergine to be found in the seeds at a concentration of 0.325% of dry weight. Two modern studies from a team of researchers also revealed lysergic acid, methylergometrine (syn. lysergic acid butanolamide), methysergide, lysergylalanine, and suspected, unidentified ergopeptines. A study of the related Ipomoea tricolor showed that ergoline concentrations in the leaves are 12-fold lower than that of the seeds.

== History ==
Despite its colloquial name of "Hawaiian baby woodrose", Argyreia nervosa is native to Asia. The popular flowering vine is often cultivated in Hawaii as climate conditions support the plants' cultivation on the island.

LSA-containing seeds have been utilized in small quantities in Ayurvedic herbal medicine. However, the seeds were not widely known to have psychoactive properties until the mid-late 20th century and have no tradition of ceremonial use for religious purposes.

== Cultivation ==
Where temperatures fall below 13 °C (55 °F), Argyreia nervosa is grown in a warm greenhouse. Elsewhere, it is grown on arbours, pergolas, walls, or trees. It is often grown professionally under glass in a loam-based potting compost (John Innes No. 3) in full light, and watered freely from spring to autumn, with a balanced liquid fertilizer applied monthly and reduced water in winter. It is grown outdoors in moderately fertile, moist but well-drained soil in full sun. Pruning is done in late winter.

== Constituents ==
In terms of total alkaloid content, the constituents of Argyreia nervosa include isoergine (31%), ergine (23%), ergometrine (8.2%), lysergic acid hydroxyethylamide (LSH) (5.8%), isolysergic acid hydroxyethylamide (iso-LSH) (4.0%), elymoclavine (3.6%), chanoclavine I (2.7%), ergometrinine (1.8%), agroclavine (1.1%), and others (19%). Other results have also been published.

=== Glycosides ===
Argyroside

Argyroside, (24R)-ergost-5-en-11-oxo-3β-ol-α-D-glucopyranoside, a steroidal glycoside unique to Argyreia nervosa

=== Ergolines ===
Argyreia nervosa contains a variety of ergolines and lysergamides, which are shown in the tables below. It has also been reported to contain methylergometrine and methysergide, which were previously believed to be exclusively synthetic compounds.

Ergoline alkaloids of known percentage
Compound name	Percentage of dry seed weight constituted	Chemical structure
Isoergine	0.188%	Ergine structure
Ergine	0.136%	Ergine structure
Ergometrine	0.049%	Ergometrine structure
Lysergic acid hydroxyethylamide	0.035%	Lysergic acid hydroxyethylamide structure
Isolysergic acid hydroxyethylamide	0.024%	Lysergic acid hydroxyethylamide structure
Elymoclavine	0.022%	Elymoclavine structure
Ergometrinine	0.011%	Ergometrinine structure
Chanoclavine	0.016%	Chanoclavine structure

Ergoline alkaloids of unknown percentage
Compound name	Chemical structure
Agroclavine	Agroclavine structure
Festuclavine	Festuclavine structure
Chanoclavine II	Chanoclavine II structure
Lysergene	Lysergene structure
Lysergol	Lysergol structure
Isolysergol	Lysergol structure
Setoclavine	Isolysergol structure
Isosetoclavine	Isolysergol structure

=== Hydroxycinnamic acids ===
Hydroxycinnamic acids
Compound name	Chemical structure
Caffeic acid	Caffeic acid structure
Ethyl caffeate	Ethyl caffeate structure

=== Fatty acids ===
Fatty acids
Compound name	Chemical structure
Myristoleic acid	Myristoleic acid structure
Myristic acid	Myristic acid structure
Palmitic acid	Palmitic acid structure
Linoleic acid	Linoleic acid structure
Linolenic acid	
Oleic acid	Oleic acid structure
Stearic acid	Stearic acid
Nonadecylic acid	Nonadecyclic acid
Eicosenoic acid	
Heneicosylic acid	Heneicosylic acid structure
Behenic acid	Behenic acid structure
12-methylmyristic acid	
15-methylstearic acid	

Glycosides of fatty acids
Fatty acid	Chemical structure
Palmitic acid	Palmitic acid structure
Oleic acid	Oleic acid structure
Stearic acid	Stearic acid structure
Behenic acid	Behenic acid structure
Linoleic acid	Linoleic acid structure
Linolenic acid	α-Linolenic acid structure

== Use as an entheogen ==
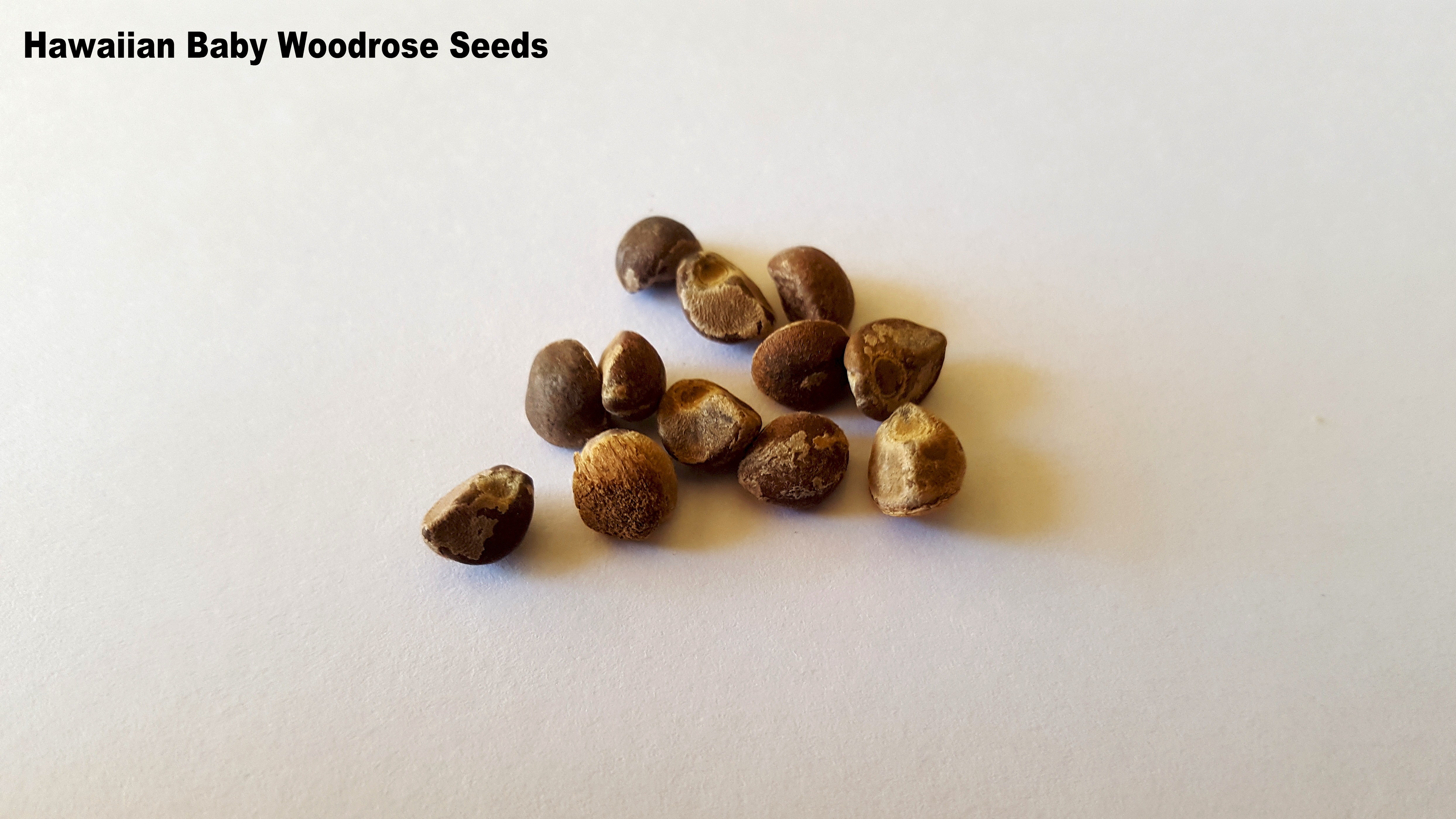
Hawaiian baby woodrose seeds

The average dose of A. nervosa when used as an entheogen to produce psychedelic effects is 2 to 10 seeds (0.2–1 g weight). One gram of A. nervosa seeds is estimated to contain between 1.7 to 16 mg combined ergine (LSA) and isoergine (iso-LSA).

=== Speculations ===
Certain New Age sources claim that, according to 'various oral histories' Huna shamans used the powdered seeds to prepare an entheogenic drink. This is unlikely to reflect an authentic practice having once formed a part of traditional Hawaiian Religion, given that Huna has been widely discredited as a culturally appropriative New Age religion invented by Max Freedom Long. The seeds of Argyreia nervosa can produce psychoactive effects, but it has not yet been demonstrated satisfactorily that their use as an entheogen predates the various countercultural movements of the 1960s. Given that A. nervosa is not native to Hawaii, having been introduced there from India, any Hawaiian practices involving it are unlikely to be of any antiquity. It cannot, however, be ruled out that the plant may have been utilised as an intoxicant in its native India at some time in the past, although evidence for this (if present) has not yet come to light.

== Uses in the traditional medicine of India ==
While he does not claim there to be any evidence for the use of the seeds of A. nervosa as a traditional entheogen in its native India, Christian Rätsch does describe some interesting traditional uses of the root of the plant in Ayurveda somewhat suggestive of effects upon the CNS:

The root is regarded as a tonic for the nerves and brain and is ingested as a rejuvenation tonic and aphrodisiac to increase intelligence.

Other traditional uses are in the treatment of gonorrhea, strangury, chronic ulcers, diabetes, anemia, and cerebral disorders. The plant is also used as appetizer, brain tonic, cardiotonic, and aphrodisiac. It possesses anti-inflammatory, immunomodulatory, antibacterial, antiviral, and antifungal activities. Claims that alternative medicines including Ayuverdic possess proven medical qualities, such as having widespread beneficial effects such as antibacterial, antiviral and antifungal activities are not claims that satisfy the scientific requirement of medical claims. Further, since the plant is partially toxic even if there were medical benefit, which is not established, this would have to be weighed against the potential poisoning impact of the substance.

== See also ==
- Morning glory (drug)
