= C16H20N2O =

The molecular formula C_{16}H_{20}N_{2}O (molar mass: 256.34 g/mol, exact mass: 256.1576 u) may refer to:

- Chanoclavine
- Chanoclavine II
- Fumigaclavine B
- 4-HO-DALT
- Paliclavine
- RU-29717
