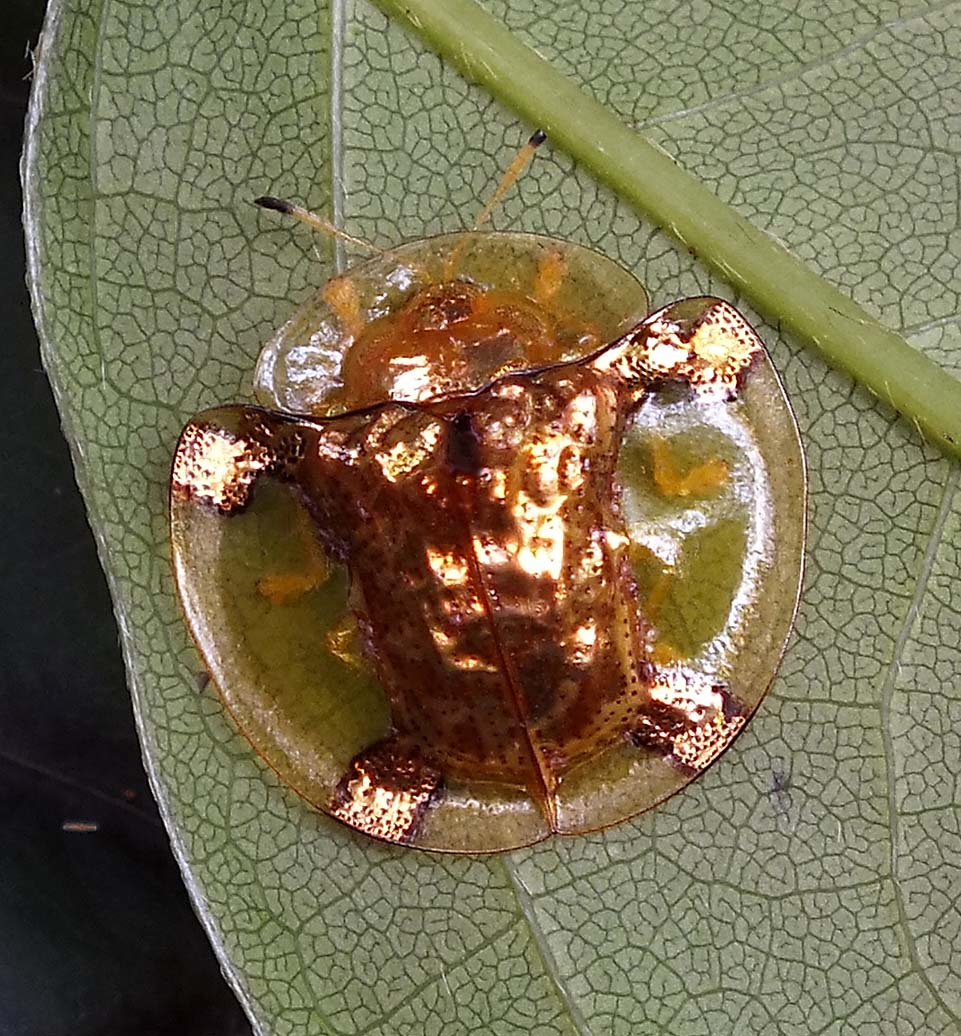

Scientific classification
- Kingdom: Animalia
- Phylum: Arthropoda
- Clade: Pancrustacea
- Class: Insecta
- Order: Coleoptera
- Suborder: Polyphaga
- Infraorder: Cucujiformia
- Family: Chrysomelidae
- Genus: Aspidimorpha
- Species: A. sanctaecrucis

Binomial name
- Aspidimorpha sanctaecrucis (Fabricius, 1792)

Synonyms
- Cassida jamaicensis Olivier, 1790 [preoccupied]; Cassida st. crucis Fabricius, 1792; Aspidomorpha bajula Boheman, 1854; Aspidomorpha fraternal Baly, 1863

= Aspidimorpha sanctaecrucis =

Species of beetle

Aspidimorpha sanctaecrucis, sometimes called the golden tortoise beetle (a common name which refers to other species elsewhere), is an Old World species of beetle belonging to the family Chrysomelidae.

== Description ==
After full development, A. sanctaecrucis will have a body length ranging from 15.6 to 16.3 mm and a body width ranging from 14.3 to 14.6 mm. Its elytra ranges in color from a uniform yellow to red brown to brown with lateral anterior and posterior corners of the margin visible dorsally. Each elytron contains a depression raised along the center behind its scutellum with prominently raised margins ending with a dorsal conical hump. It has approximately 9 rows of elytral punctures and explanate margins that are very broad. The general color of A. sanctaecrucis ranges from yellow to brown; its head and body color ranges from yellow to red brown, and its legs and antennae (excluding the last two antennomeres) are uniformly yellow. Its elytra can be uniformly yellow to red brown to brown. Its eyes are elliptical, the head has a distinct gena and its clypeus is depressed medially. It has fine clypeal grooves throughout and an emarginate labrum.

The elytra have an explanate margin broader than the width of the disc and a body length exceeding 15 mm making it the largest species of Aspidimorpha in Kerala, India.A. sanctaecrucis is often confused with A. miliaris, resembling it in size and in the anterior and posterior angles of the elytral margin. However, the prominent ridge and longitudinal depression between the humerus and scutellum at the base of the elytra is diagnostic for A. sanctaecrucis, as well as the presence of a prominent dorsal hump, which is absent in A. miliaris.

== Geographic range ==
A. sanctaecrucis has been reported in regions in Southwestern India, Central Asia, Southern China, and Southeastern Asia, including Malaysia and Indonesia. A. sanctaecrucis is well adapted for living in tropical environments, where rainfall is ample but unpredictable, and where food resources are available throughout the year. The species is active in the rainy season and enters diapause in the winter and summer. It lives on several species of Convolvulaceae, which are commonly known as Morning glory flowers, including Argyreia hookeri, Argyreia cuneata, and Ipomoea carnea. I. carnea is a shrub-like morning glory which grows as a weed in moist soil. It has a robust stem that allows it to stand erect until it reaches about 200–250 cm at which point it falls to the ground. A. sanctaecrucis can fly between plants and easily colonize newly formed plant patches where they are less likely to experience wasp parasitism than in older patches. The presence of A. sanctaecrucis on host leaves can be deduced from the beetle's irregular feeding pattern. The larvae and adults only feed on the peripheral margins of the lower surface of the leaf, leaving holes of variable size. This beetle is widely distributed and is oftentimes found sympatric with populations of Aspidimorpha miliaris on I. carnea.

A. sanctaecrucis can be found in southeastern Asia, from China and India to Indonesia.

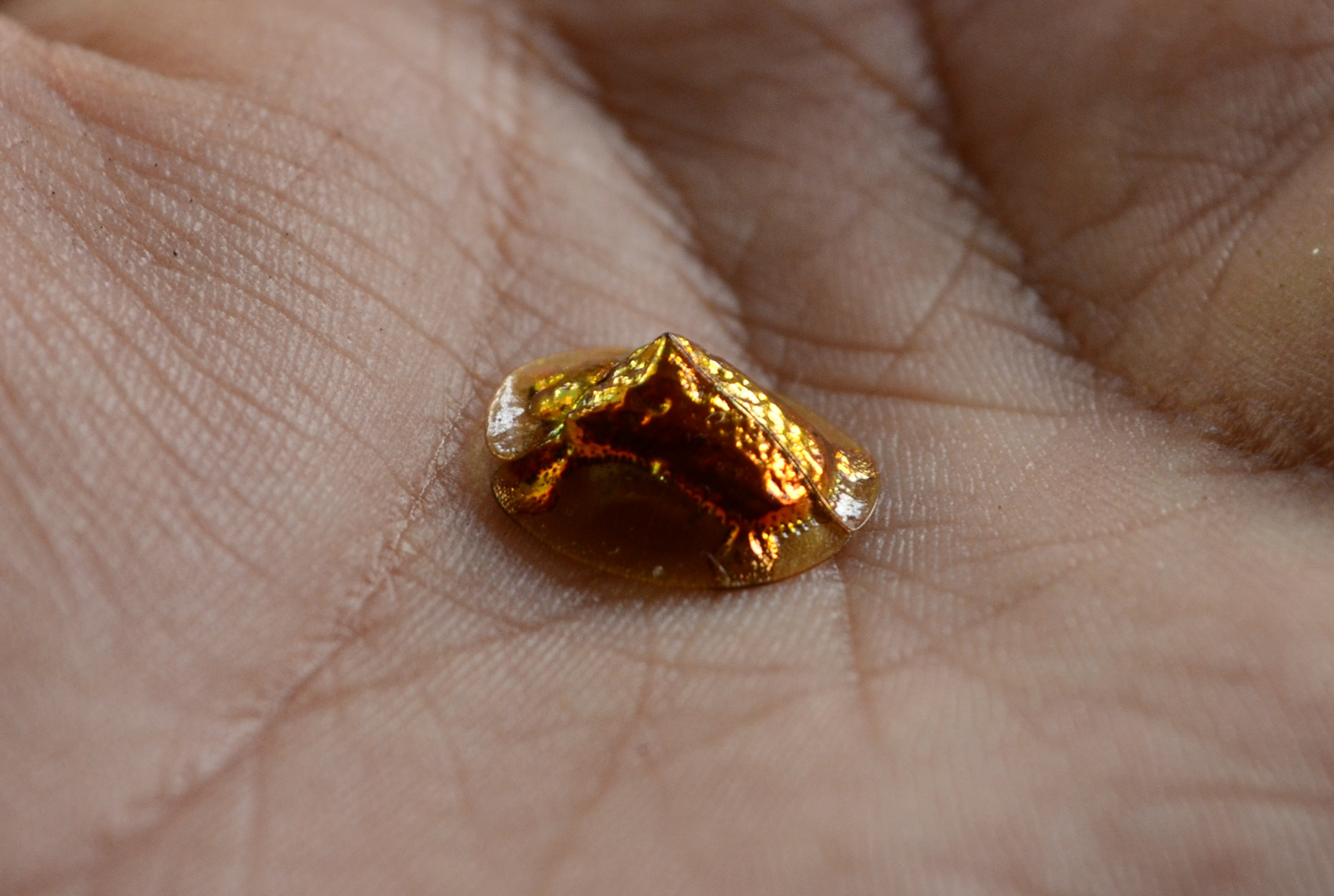
A. sanctaecrucis sitting on a human palm

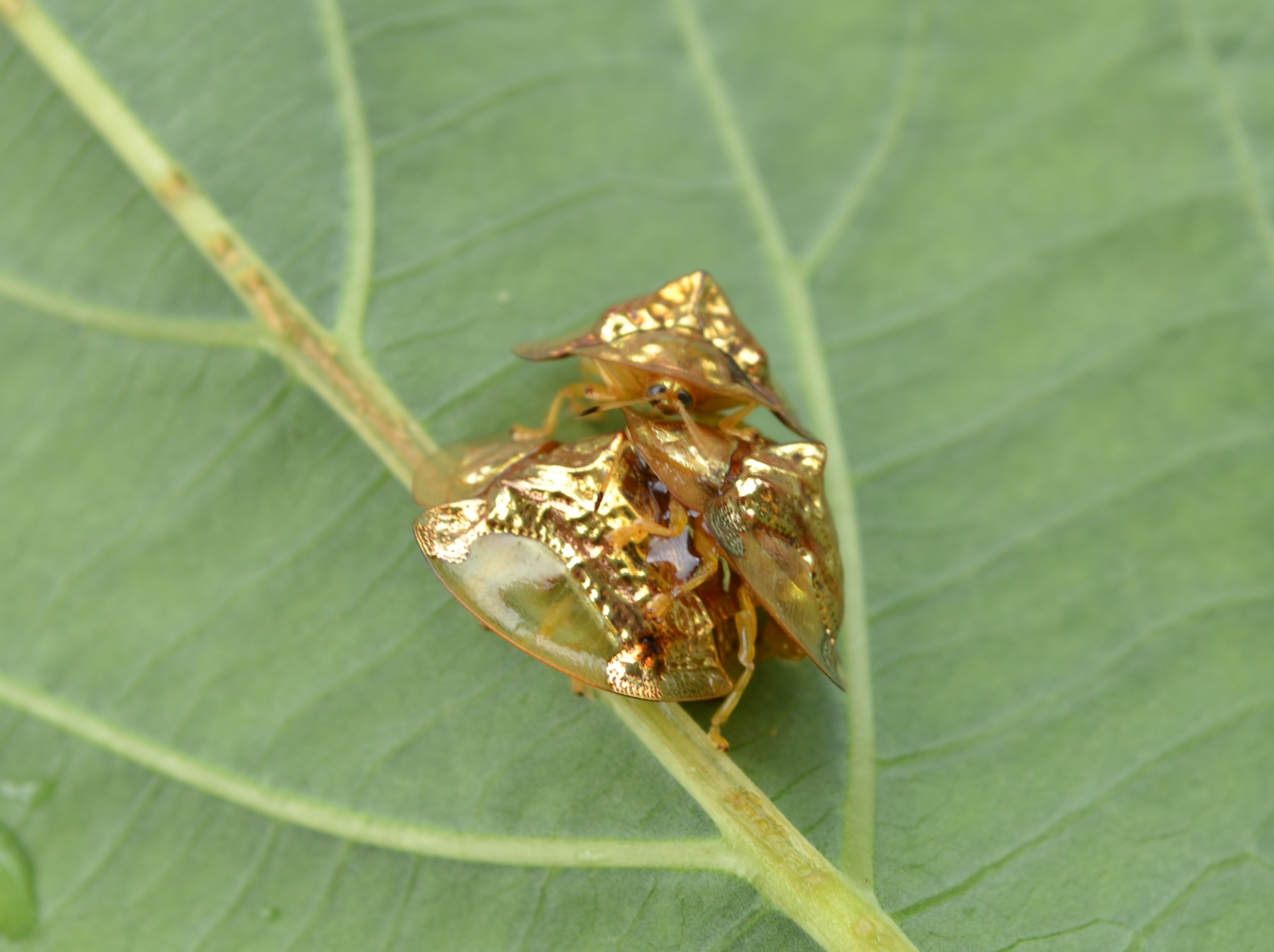
A. sanctaecrucis on an Ipomoea leaf

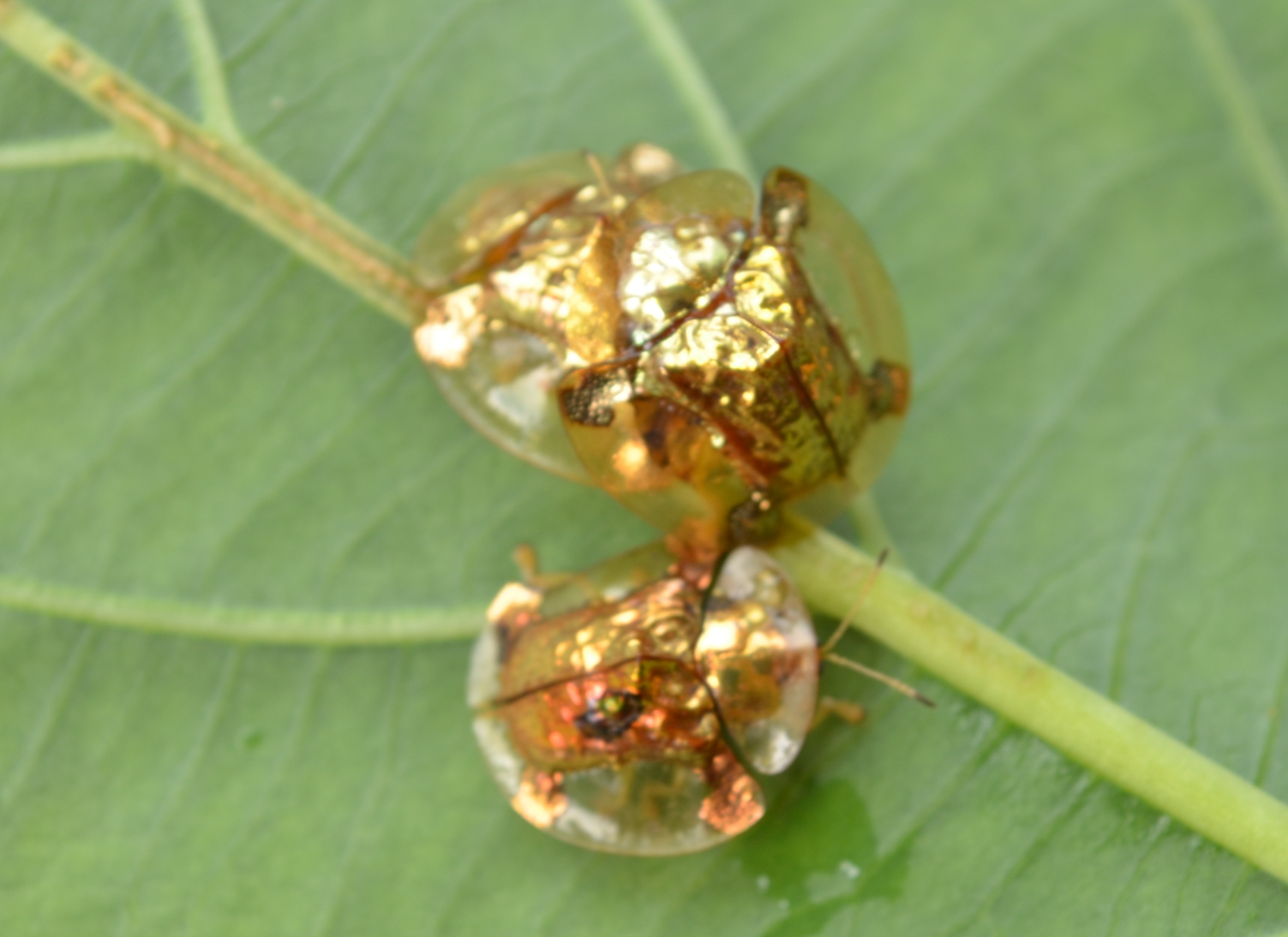
A. sanctaecrucis on an Ipomoea leaf

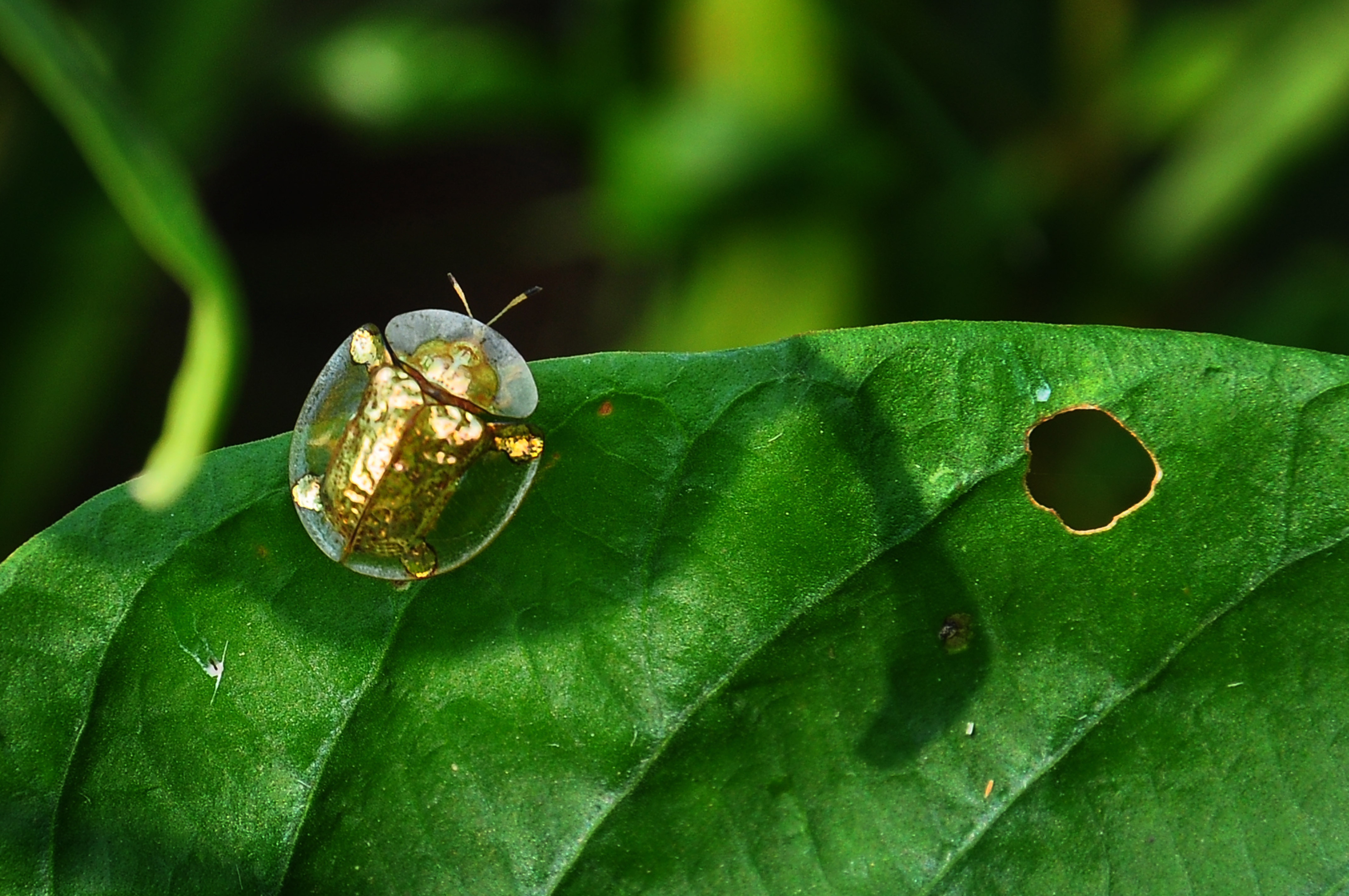
A. sanctaecrucis on a leaf

== Parental care ==
=== Oviposition ===
Females lay eggs at a constant rate during the reproductive period. The total number of eggs produced per female is positively correlated with the longevity of the female. Due to its prolonged reproductive schedule, high egg output, and strong dispersal power, A. sanctaecrucis is well suited to live in highly disturbed tropical environments. In ideal environments, A. sanctaecrucis experience extreme longevity despite suffering high egg mortality from parasitism from wasps.

== Reproductive organs ==
Because of its agricultural relevance, A. sanctaecrucis has become an economically important beetle with dedicated research interest. Understanding its reproductive potential can give insights into appropriate pest control strategies to protect crops. As a result, its reproductive structures and gametogenic stages have been thoroughly investigated.

The male A. sanctaecrucis features a pair of testis that are made up of six seminiferous tubules in its abdominal region. The tubules are lined with simple high columnar epithelium and range in length from 800 to 850 uM. The seminiferous tubules can be divided into three zones: growth, maturation, and transformation. The zone of growth consists of spermatocytes under mitosis, separate from the spermatogonia. The zone of maturation is found in the spermatids and cycles every two meiotic divisions. The transformation zone is filled with spermatozoa. The seminiferous tubule of the A. sanctaecrucis is required for sperm production which is made up of 5 stages in tortoise beetles. These stages are spermatogonia, primary spermatocytes, secondary spermatocytes, spermatids and spermatozoa. The spermatogonia of the male A. sanctaecrucis can either be oval or spherical shape with a cell diameter of approximately 10-12 uM.

Female A. sanctaecrucis contain a pair of ovaries that consist of several ovarioles each surrounded by a peritoneal membrane. The ovarian duct is covered by a simple columnar epithelium. This epithelium functions to produce secretions that contain carbohydrates and proteins that support the production of the egg membrane. Within the ovary, there are oocytes embedded at various stages. Additionally, there are nurse cells in the terminal filament that function to support the nutrition for the oocyte. The ovary features two distinct zones, the germarium and vitellarium, that are divided according to histological features. The oogonia reside mainly in the germarium where they undergo mitotic processing. Differentiated oocytes can be found in the vitellarium arranged from previtellogenic to vitellogenic stages in a linear arrangement. The previtellogenic oocyte is an oval shape about 300 uM in diameter. It contains a central nucleus about 70 uM in diameter, but by the end of the vitellogenic stage, it decreases to 10 um. However, the size of the vitellogenic oocyte increases to about 450-500 uM compared to previous stages.

== Life history ==
=== Life cycle ===
A. sanctaecrucis lays eggs in a paper substance (ootheca) underneath fully opened leaves in aggregates that remain there after hatching into larvae. Clusters can range from 3-18 eggs, but on average, consist of about 11 eggs. In one study using Ipomoea carnea as a host plant, A. sanctaecrucis was observed to have a life cycle that ranged from 30 to 37 days under laboratory conditions. This included an egg incubation period of 7–9 days and five successive larval stages followed by a pupal stage. In a separate study that used Ipomoea Batatas as the host, A. miliaris, a coexisting species, was observed to have a life cycle of about one month. In this study, it was observed that the species and nutritional contents of the host plant significantly affected factors like its life cycle, reproductive rate, mortality rate, life span, and size. Currently, there are no studies on whether these factors affect A. sanctaecrucis which could be a future area of research.

=== Senescence ===
The mean longevity of A. sanctaecrucis is 63.8 days for males and 83.3 days for females. The maximum longevity can range from 5–6 months. The average length of the pre-reproductive period is 33.8 days, which is significantly longer the post-reproductive period (14.3 days).

It was also observed that the ground color of the elytra in A. sanctaecrucis changed remarkably with age notably undergoing three color changes. The color change can be used as a rough measure for determining the age of adults.

== Enemies ==
=== Predators ===
Ants attack egg masses, larvae, and pupae. This can lead to fluctuations in adult populations based on predation.

=== Parasites ===
Parasitic wasps have also been found to surround ovipositing females and attack newly laid egg masses and pupae.

== Mutualism ==
A. sanctaecrucis are able to break down the components of the plant cell wall, like cellulose and pectin, with the help of endosymbiotic bacteria. These bacteria lie in sac-like organs in adult tortoise beetles and in the foregut of larval A. sanctaecrucis where they produce pectinase. A. sanctaecrucis require the enzymes produced by these bacteria to digest vegetation, but the bacteria are also dependent on the beetle for survival. This demonstrates a clear symbiotic relationship between these plant-digesting bacteria and A. sanctaecrucis.

== Interactions with humans and livestock ==
=== Pest of crop plants ===
A. sanctaecrucis is considered to be an agricultural pest known for infesting sweet potato plants (I. Batatas) along with other species of tortoise beetles including Aspidimorpha furcata, Aspidimorpha miliaris, Cassida circumdata, Chiridopsis bipunctata, Laccoptera nepalensis, and Aspidimorpha fuscopunctata. Species of tortoise beetles are a threat to vegetation because of the irregular circular holes they leave in plant leaves. This eliminates most of a leaf's surface area until only the skeleton of the leaf is left over. Heavy feeding from adult and larvae can lead to a significant reduction in yield, especially if defoliation occurs within the first two months.
