= Gold bug (disambiguation) =

A gold bug is a person who is bullish on gold and related investment products, or supports the use of the gold standard.

Gold bug or Goldbug may also refer to:

- "The Gold-Bug", a short story by Edgar Allan Poe
- The Gold Bug (musical), an 1896 operetta by Victor Herbert
- "The Gold Bug" (Card short story), by Orson Scott Card
- Goldbug (band), a British band active during the mid-to-late 1990s
- Goldbug (comics), a Marvel Comics character
- Goldbug (Transformers), any of several characters from the Transformers toy line
- Goldbug, a character in Richard Scarry's children's books
- The name formerly used by Oklahoma City University athletic teams
- "The Gold Bug", an instrumental by the Alan Parsons Project on the album The Turn of a Friendly Card
- Goldbug, Kentucky
- Golden tortoise beetle, commonly known as a "goldbug"
- Sedalia Goldbugs, a defunct minor league baseball team in Missouri, US

== See also ==
- Guldbagge Awards (lit. 'golden beetle'), Swedish film awards
- Gold as an investment
- Gold standard
