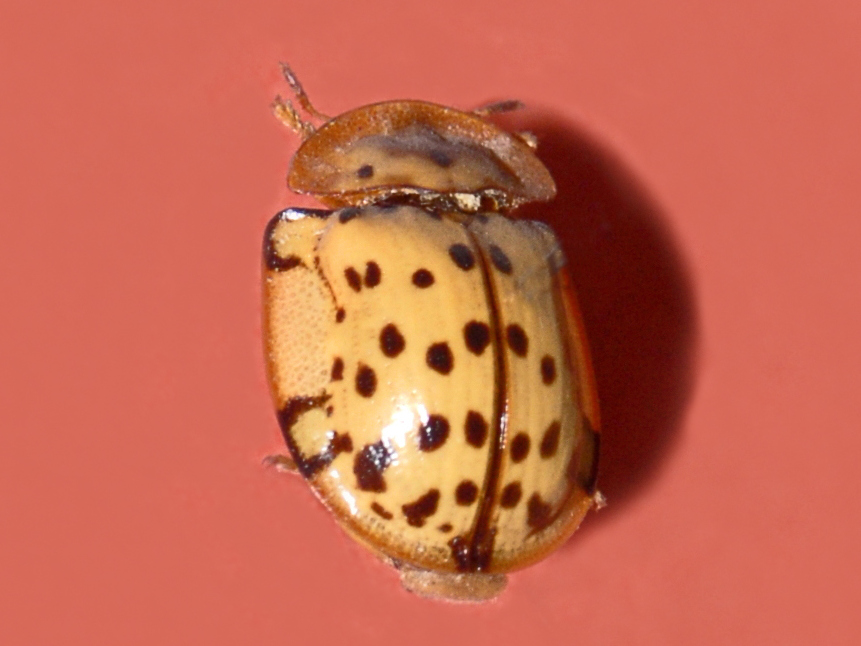
- Museum specimen

Scientific classification
- Kingdom: Animalia
- Phylum: Arthropoda
- Clade: Pancrustacea
- Class: Insecta
- Order: Coleoptera
- Suborder: Polyphaga
- Infraorder: Cucujiformia
- Family: Chrysomelidae
- Genus: Aspidimorpha
- Species: A. quadrimaculata

Binomial name
- Aspidimorpha quadrimaculata Olivier

= Aspidimorpha quadrimaculata =

Species of beetle

Aspidimorpha quadrimaculata is a species of beetles belonging to the Chrysomelidae family. This species can be found in East Africa.
