= Chiridopsis marginata =

Scientific classification
- Kingdom: Animalia
- Phylum: Arthropoda
- Class: Insecta
- Order: Coleoptera
- Suborder: Polyphaga
- Infraorder: Cucujiformia
- Family: Chrysomelidae
- Genus: Chiridopsis
- Species: C. marginata

Binomial name
- Chiridopsis marginata (Weise, 1901)

Synonyms
- Stilpnaspis marginata Weise, 1905; Cassida ornata Fabricius, 1798; Coptocycla ornata Boheman, 1855; Chirida ornata Weise, 1901; Chiridopsis ornata Borowiec, 1990; Chirida ornata var. marginata Weise, 1901; Chirida ornata ab. marginata Spaeth, 1914; Chiridopsis marginata Borowiec, 1999

Species of beetle

Chiridopsis marginata, is a species of leaf beetle found in India, and Sri Lanka.

It is seed borer of mango.

== Subspecies ==
Two subspecies recognized.

- Chiridopsis marginata ornata - India
- Chiridopsis marginata marginata - Sri Lanka, South India
