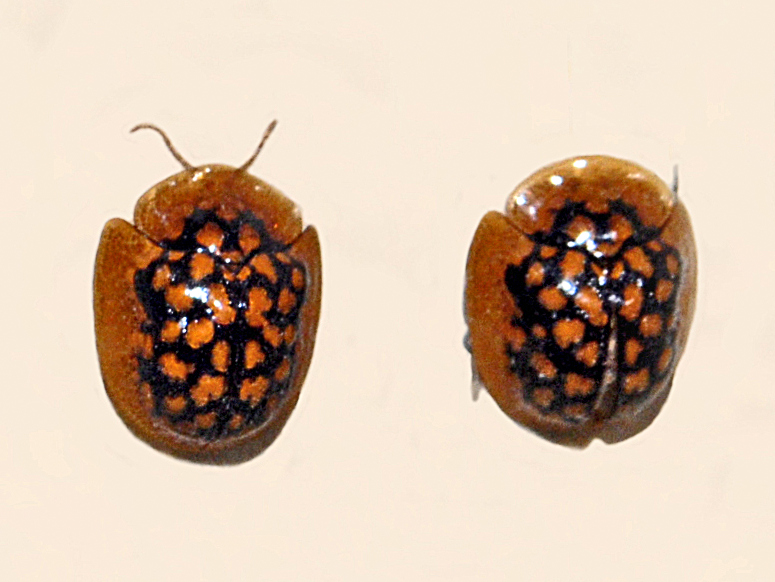
- Chiridopsis punctata from Java

Scientific classification
- Kingdom: Animalia
- Phylum: Arthropoda
- Clade: Pancrustacea
- Class: Insecta
- Order: Coleoptera
- Suborder: Polyphaga
- Infraorder: Cucujiformia
- Family: Chrysomelidae
- Genus: Chiridopsis
- Species: C. punctata

Binomial name
- Chiridopsis punctata (Weber, 1801)

Synonyms
- Chirida punctata Weise, 1897

= Chiridopsis punctata =

Species of beetle

Chiridopsis punctata is a species of leaf beetles belonging to the family Chrysomelidae.

== Description ==
Chiridopsis punctata can reach a length of about 5–6 millimetres (0.20–0.24 in) and a width of about 4–5 millimetres (0.16–0.20 in), The body is almost circular, with wide explanate margins of the elytra and a rounded anterior margin of the pronotum. Disc is strongly convex. Elytra are black with faint green spots. They are surrounded by a yellowish line along the entire margins of the pronotal and elytral discs (in dried specimens such a line and the spots become reddish-brown). Head, ventrites, legs, and antennae are yellow. The most similar species is Chiridopsis rubromaculata, but it differs in colour of spots being red.

These beetles can be found in large number throughout the year, although their number in the winter months is slightly higher. The pupal stage takes place in June and last ten days. The main host plants are Argyreia species and, Ipomoea species (Convolvulaceae).

== Distribution ==
This species is present in southern Asia, in Northeastern India, Southern China, Indonesia (Sumatra, Java), Malaysia (Borneo), Thailand and Vietnam.
