= Golden tortoise beetle =

Golden tortoise beetle may refer to the leaf beetles:

- Aspidimorpha furcata, native to Asia
- Aspidimorpha sanctaecrucis, native to southeastern Asia
- Charidotella egregia
- Charidotella sexpunctata, native to the Americas

== See also ==
- Ischnocodia annulus
