= C19H23N3O2 =

The molecular formula C_{19}H_{23}N_{3}O_{2} (molar mass : 325.41 g/mol) may refer to:

- ABT-670, a potent, orally bioavailable dopamine agonist
- Ergometrine, a primary ergot and morning glory alkaloid
- Ergometrinine, an ergot alkaloid
