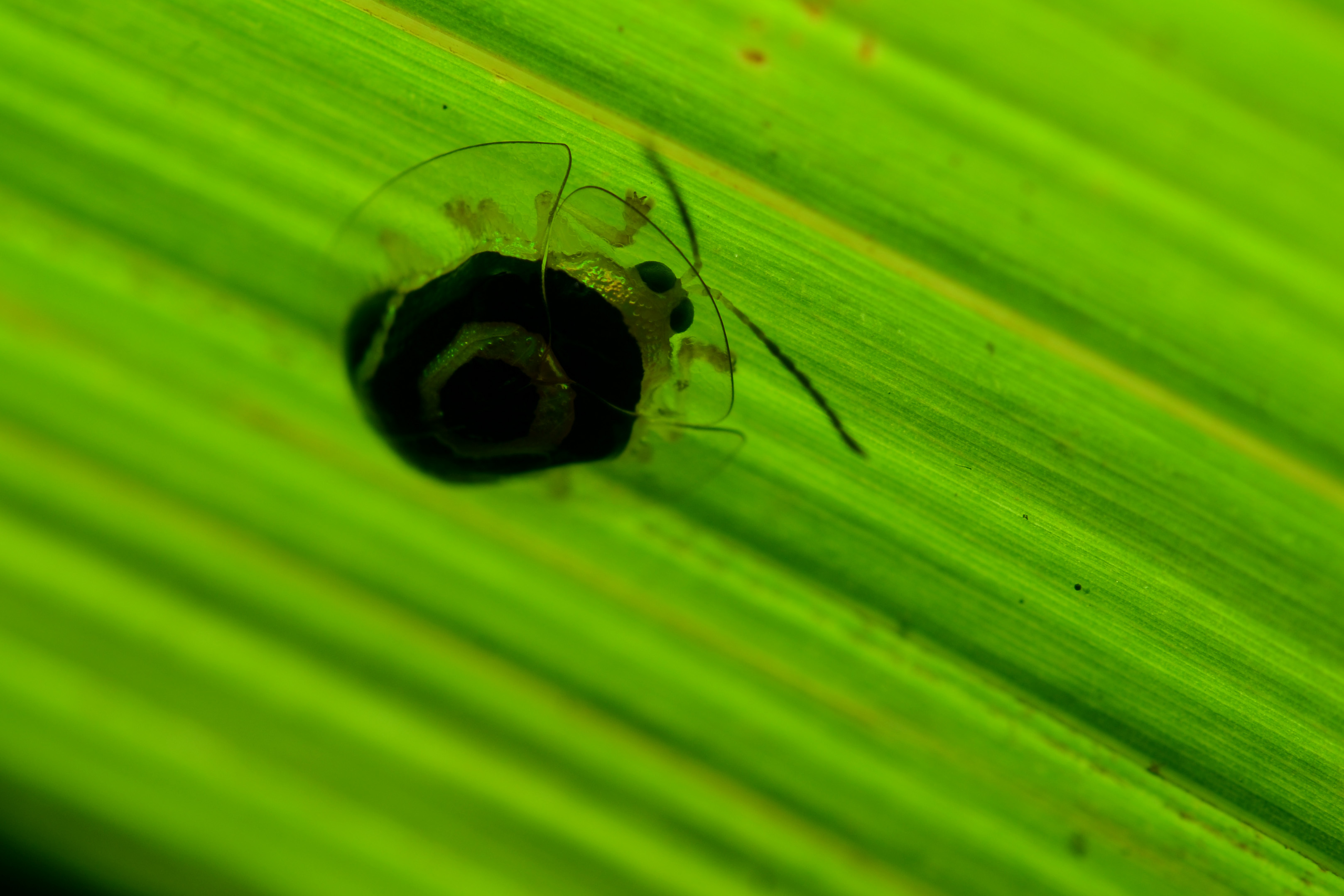
- Ischnocodia annulus

Scientific classification
- Kingdom: Animalia
- Phylum: Arthropoda
- Clade: Pancrustacea
- Class: Insecta
- Order: Coleoptera
- Suborder: Polyphaga
- Infraorder: Cucujiformia
- Family: Chrysomelidae
- Subfamily: Cassidinae
- Tribe: Cassidini
- Genus: Ischnocodia; Spaeth, 1942

= Ischnocodia =

Genus of tortoise beetles

Ischnocodia is a genus of beetles belonging to the family Chrysomelidae.

The species of this genus are found in Southern America.

Species:

- Ischnocodia annulus (Fabricius, 1781)
- Ischnocodia succincta (Boheman, 1855)
