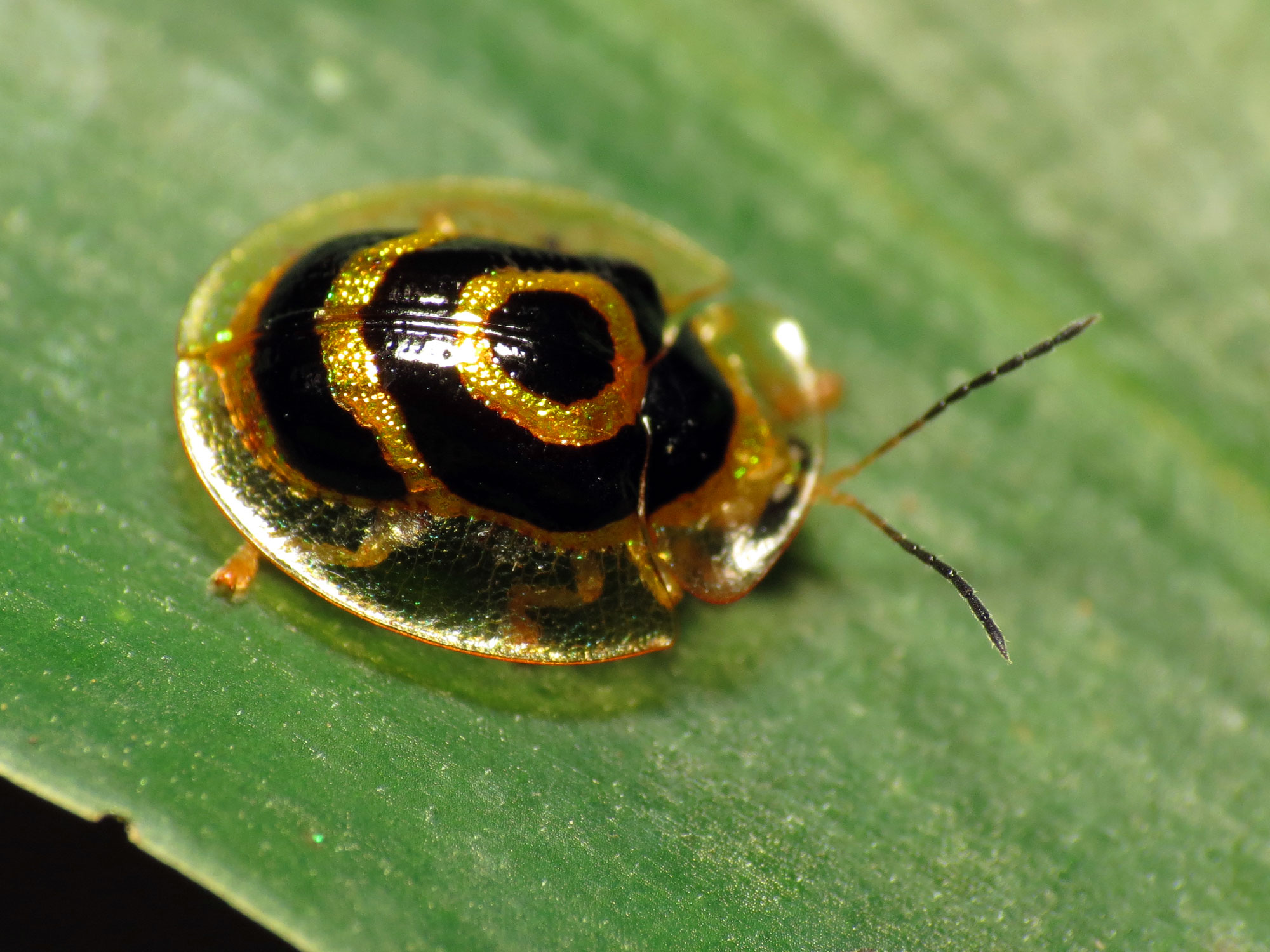

Scientific classification
- Kingdom: Animalia
- Phylum: Arthropoda
- Class: Insecta
- Order: Coleoptera
- Suborder: Polyphaga
- Infraorder: Cucujiformia
- Family: Chrysomelidae
- Genus: Ischnocodia
- Species: I. annulus

Binomial name
- Ischnocodia annulus (Fabricius, 1781)

= Ischnocodia annulus =

Species of beetle

Ischnocodia annulus, common name golden target beetle or ringed tortoise beetle, is a species of turtle beetle in the family Chrysomelidae.

== See also ==
- Golden tortoise beetle
