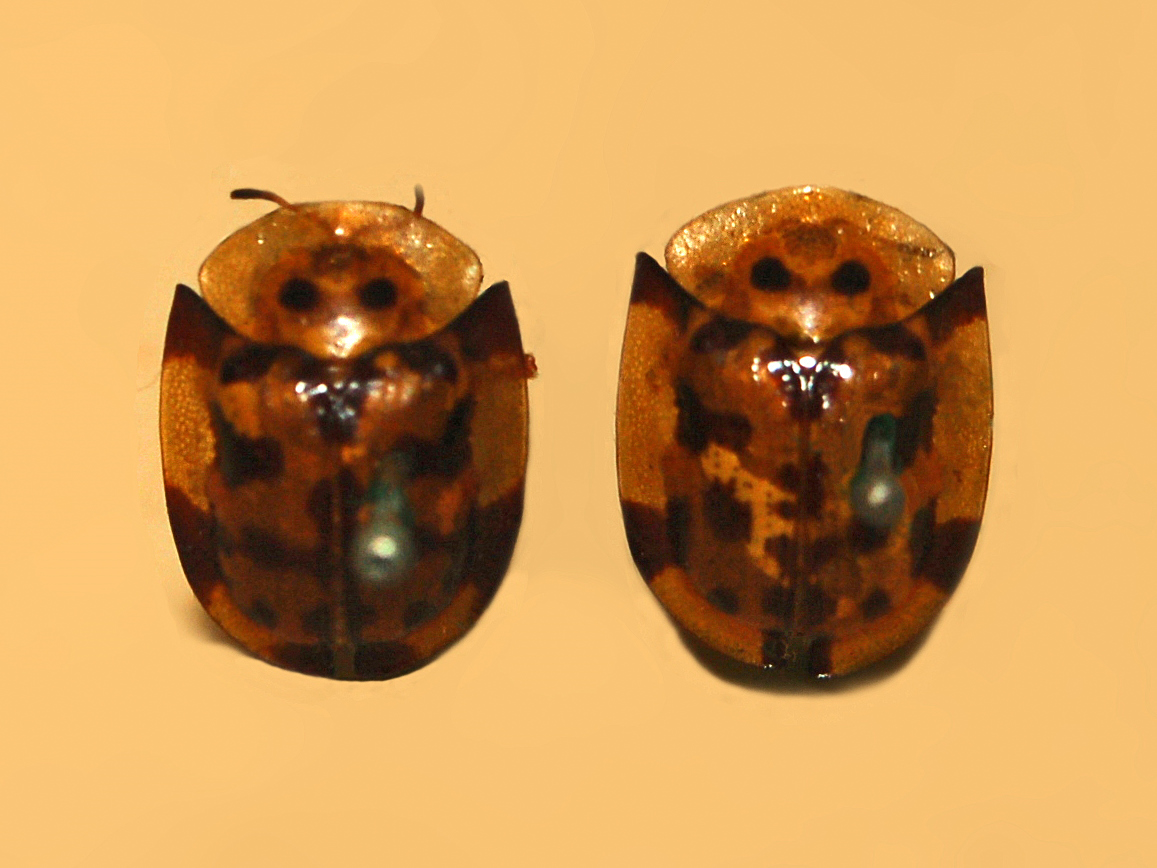
- Aspidimorpha deusta from Australia

Scientific classification
- Kingdom: Animalia
- Phylum: Arthropoda
- Clade: Pancrustacea
- Class: Insecta
- Order: Coleoptera
- Suborder: Polyphaga
- Infraorder: Cucujiformia
- Family: Chrysomelidae
- Genus: Aspidimorpha
- Species: A. deusta

Binomial name
- Aspidimorpha deusta (Fabricius, 1775)

= Aspidimorpha deusta =

Species of beetle

Aspidimorpha deusta is a species of beetles belonging to the Chrysomelidae family.

== Description ==
This species reaches about 10 millimetres (0.39 in) in length.

== Distribution ==
Aspidimorpha deusta occurs in Indonesia, Malaysia and Australia.
