= Aspidimorpha lobata =

Scientific classification
- Kingdom: Animalia
- Phylum: Arthropoda
- Clade: Pancrustacea
- Class: Insecta
- Order: Coleoptera
- Suborder: Polyphaga
- Infraorder: Cucujiformia
- Family: Chrysomelidae
- Genus: Aspidimorpha
- Species: A. lobata

Binomial name
- Aspidimorpha lobata (Boheman, 1854)

Synonyms
- Aspidimorpha indica Boheman, 1854; Aspidomorpha indica (Boheman, 1775); Cassida furcata Thunberg, 1789; Aspidomorpha sanctaecrucis ssp. lobata Spaeth, 1914; Aspidimorpha (Aspidimorpha) lobata Borowiec, 1999

Species of beetle

Aspidimorpha lobata, is a species of leaf beetle found in India, Sri Lanka and Bangladesh.
