= Aspidimorpha dorsata =

Scientific classification
- Kingdom: Animalia
- Phylum: Arthropoda
- Clade: Pancrustacea
- Class: Insecta
- Order: Coleoptera
- Suborder: Polyphaga
- Infraorder: Cucujiformia
- Family: Chrysomelidae
- Genus: Aspidimorpha
- Species: A. dorsata

Binomial name
- Aspidimorpha dorsata (Fabricius, 1787)

Synonyms
- Cassida dorsata Fabricius, 1787; Aspidimorpha fuscopunctata Boheman, 1854; Aspidimorpha rubrodorsata Boheman, 1854

Species of beetle

Aspidimorpha dorsata, is a species of leaf beetle widely distributed in South Asia and South East Asia.

== Description ==
Body length is about 8 to 10 mm. Body sub-circular. Two variations can occur as continental morph and insular morph.
