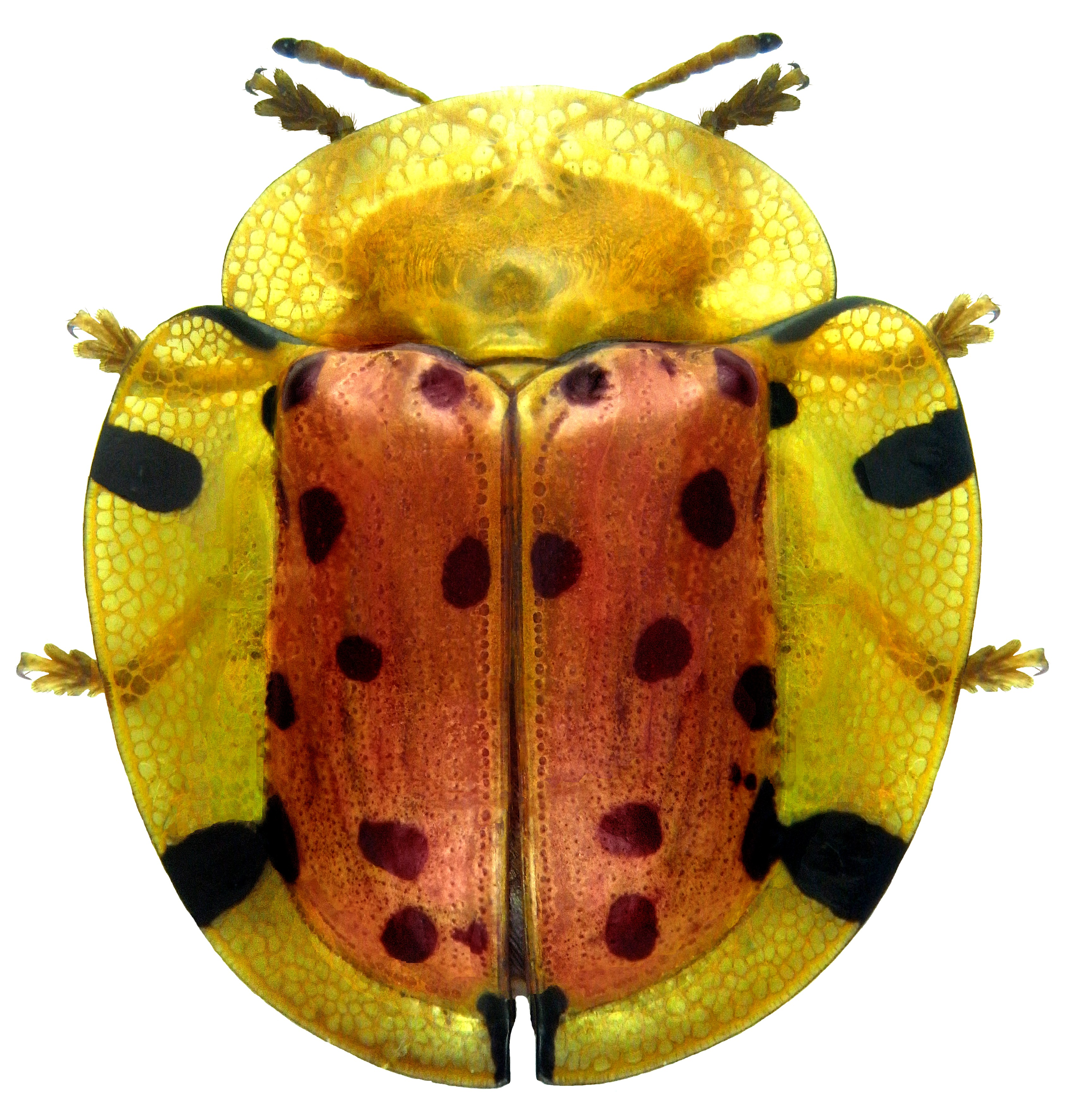
- Aspidimorpha miliaris from South Goa, India

Scientific classification
- Kingdom: Animalia
- Phylum: Arthropoda
- Clade: Pancrustacea
- Class: Insecta
- Order: Coleoptera
- Suborder: Polyphaga
- Infraorder: Cucujiformia
- Family: Chrysomelidae
- Genus: Aspidimorpha
- Species: A. miliaris

Binomial name
- Aspidimorpha miliaris (Fabricius, 1775)

= Aspidimorpha miliaris =

Species of beetle

Aspidimorpha miliaris is a widespread Asian species of beetles belonging to the family Chrysomelidae. The genus name is frequently misspelled as "Aspidomorpha", due to an unjustified spelling change in 1848 .

== Description ==
This species reaches about 15 millimetres (0.59 in) in length. Larvae have a gregarious habit and feed on Ipomoea species, with potentially dangerous impact on crops. Its back is yellowish brown with a scattering of black spots. The number and pattern of spots varies greatly between individuals, with some beetles possessing almost no spots, while others have many.

== Distribution ==
Aspidimorpha miliaris occurs throughout SE Asia and India. This beetle group is oftentimes found synonymous with populations of Aspidimorpha Sanctaecrucis on I. carnea.
