= Chanoclavine-I dehydrogenase =

Enzyme

Identifiers
- EC no.: 1.1.1.332

Databases
- IntEnz: IntEnz view
- BRENDA: BRENDA entry
- ExPASy: NiceZyme view
- KEGG: KEGG entry
- MetaCyc: metabolic pathway
- PRIAM: profile
- PDB structures: RCSB PDB PDBe PDBsum
Search
- PMC: articles
- PubMed: articles
- NCBI: proteins

Chanoclavine-I dehydrogenase (EC 1.1.1.332, easD (gene), fgaDH (gene)) is an enzyme with systematic name chanoclavine-I:NAD^{+} oxidoreductase. This enzyme catalises the following chemical reaction:

chanoclavine
+ NAD^{+}
H^{+}
H^{+}
chanoclavine-I aldehyde
+ NADH

This enzyme catalyses a step in the pathway of ergot alkaloid biosynthesis in certain fungi.
