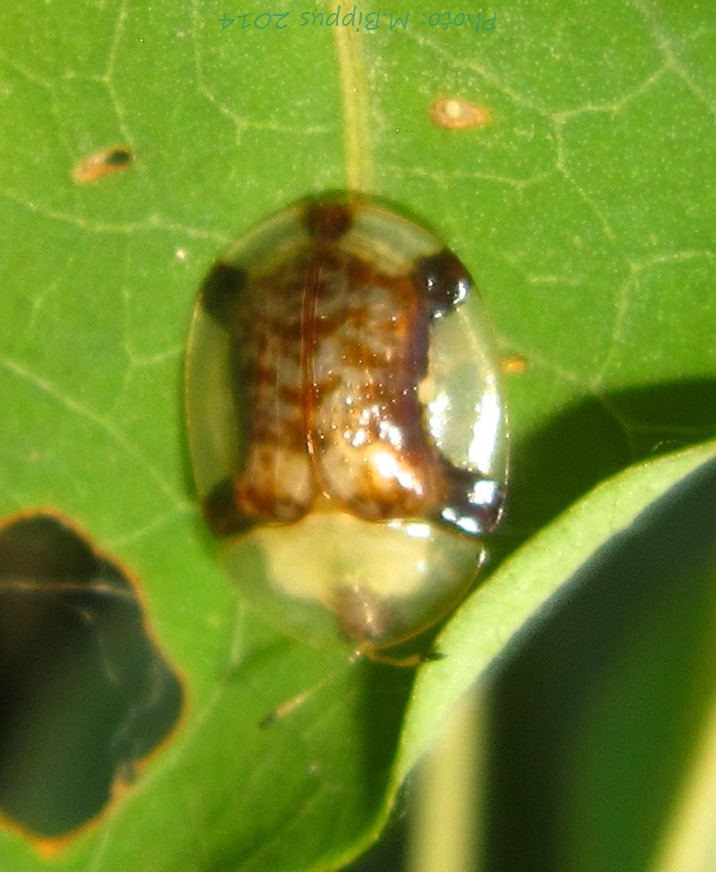

Scientific classification
- Kingdom: Animalia
- Phylum: Arthropoda
- Clade: Pancrustacea
- Class: Insecta
- Order: Coleoptera
- Suborder: Polyphaga
- Infraorder: Cucujiformia
- Family: Chrysomelidae
- Genus: Aspidimorpha
- Species: A. quinquefasciata

Binomial name
- Aspidimorpha quinquefasciata (Fabricius, 1801)

Synonyms
- Cassida quinquefasciata Fabricius, 1801; Cassida pectoralis Olivier, 1808; Aspidomorpha principalis Spaeth, 1932

= Aspidimorpha quinquefasciata =

Species of beetle

Aspidimorpha quinquefasciata is a species of beetles belonging to the family Chrysomelidae.

== Distribution ==
This species has its origins in Africa where it is known from Cameroon, Centrafrique, Congo, Chad, Gabon, the Gambia, Ghana, Guinea Bissau, Ivory Coast, Niger, Nigeria, Senegal and Togo but also from several islands as São Tomé and Príncipe, Madagascar and Réunion.

It was introduced to New Caledonia in 2008.

== Biology ==
The larvae feed on leaves of Convolvulaceae, Ipomoea batatas (sweet potatoes).
