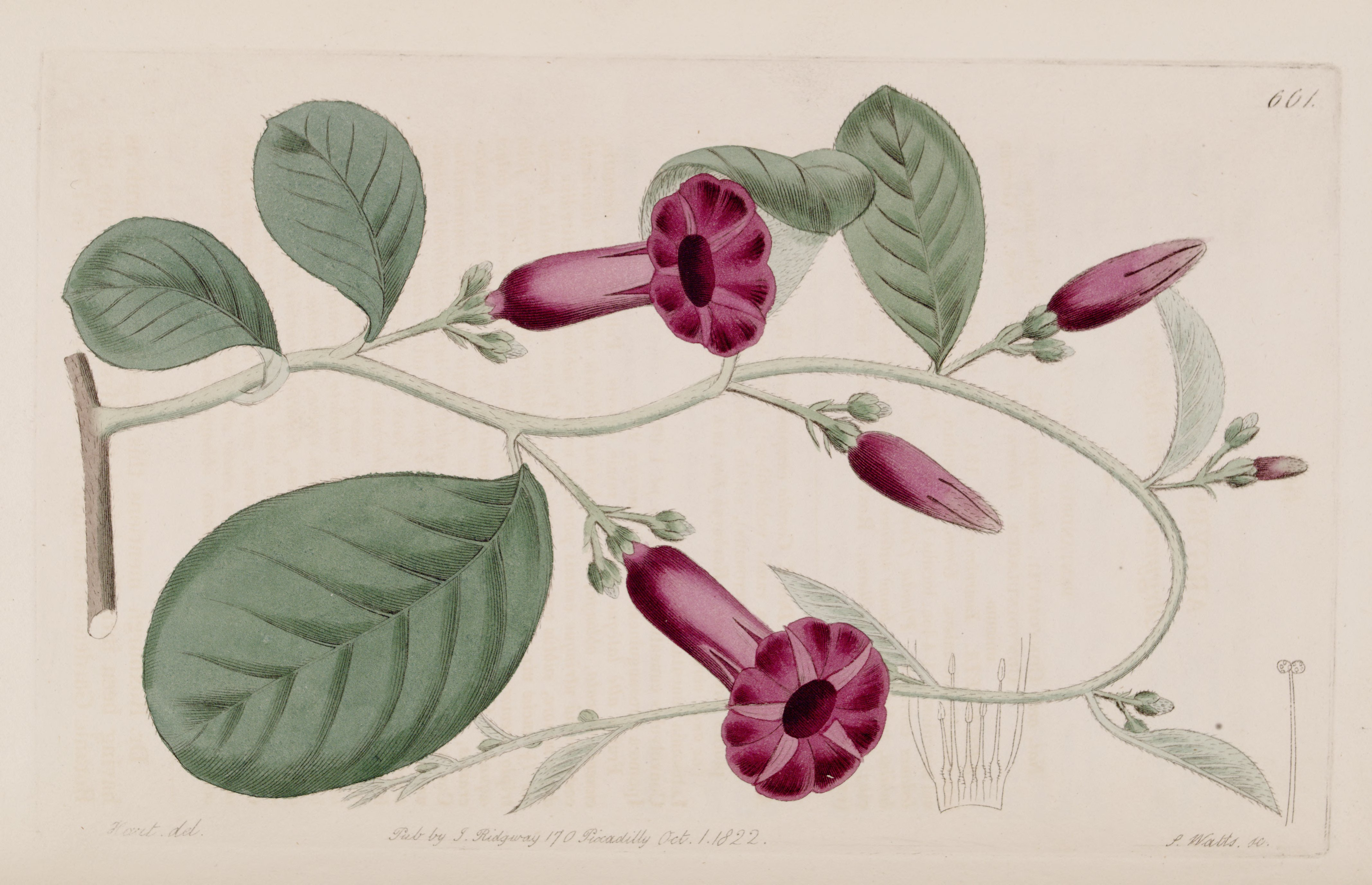

Scientific classification
- Kingdom: Plantae
- Clade: Tracheophytes
- Clade: Angiosperms
- Clade: Eudicots
- Clade: Asterids
- Order: Solanales
- Family: Convolvulaceae
- Genus: Argyreia
- Species: A. cuneata

Binomial name
- Argyreia cuneata Ker Gawl.

= Argyreia cuneata =

Species of flowering plant

Argyreia cuneata is a perennial climbing shrub which is native to the Indian subcontinent and is related to Argyreia nervosa.

Common names include purple morning glory, mahalungi, and kallana gida.

== Description ==
Argyreia cuneata is a perennial climbing shrub growing from 150–200 cm. Its stems are covered with soft white hair. The leaves are about 6 centimeters long by 2.5 wide with wedge-shaped bases. The flowers are purple and about 5 cm long. The seeds are brown, about 1 cm long, and elliptically shaped.

== Toxicity ==
Like those of Argyreia nervosa, the seeds of A. cuneata contain various ergoline alkaloids such as chanoclavines and lysergic acid amides.

== Medicinal uses ==
The leaves are traditionally used for treatment of diabetes.
