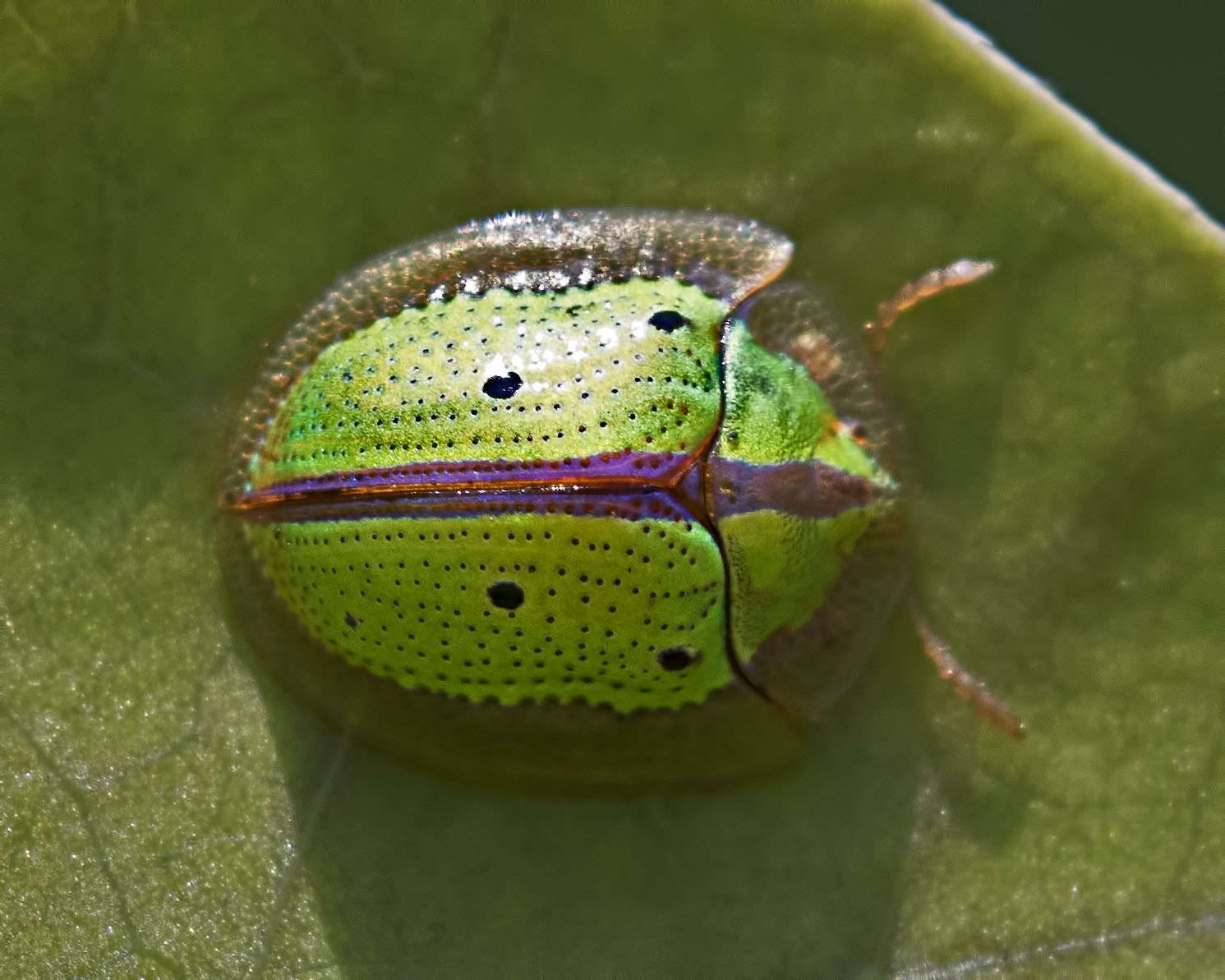

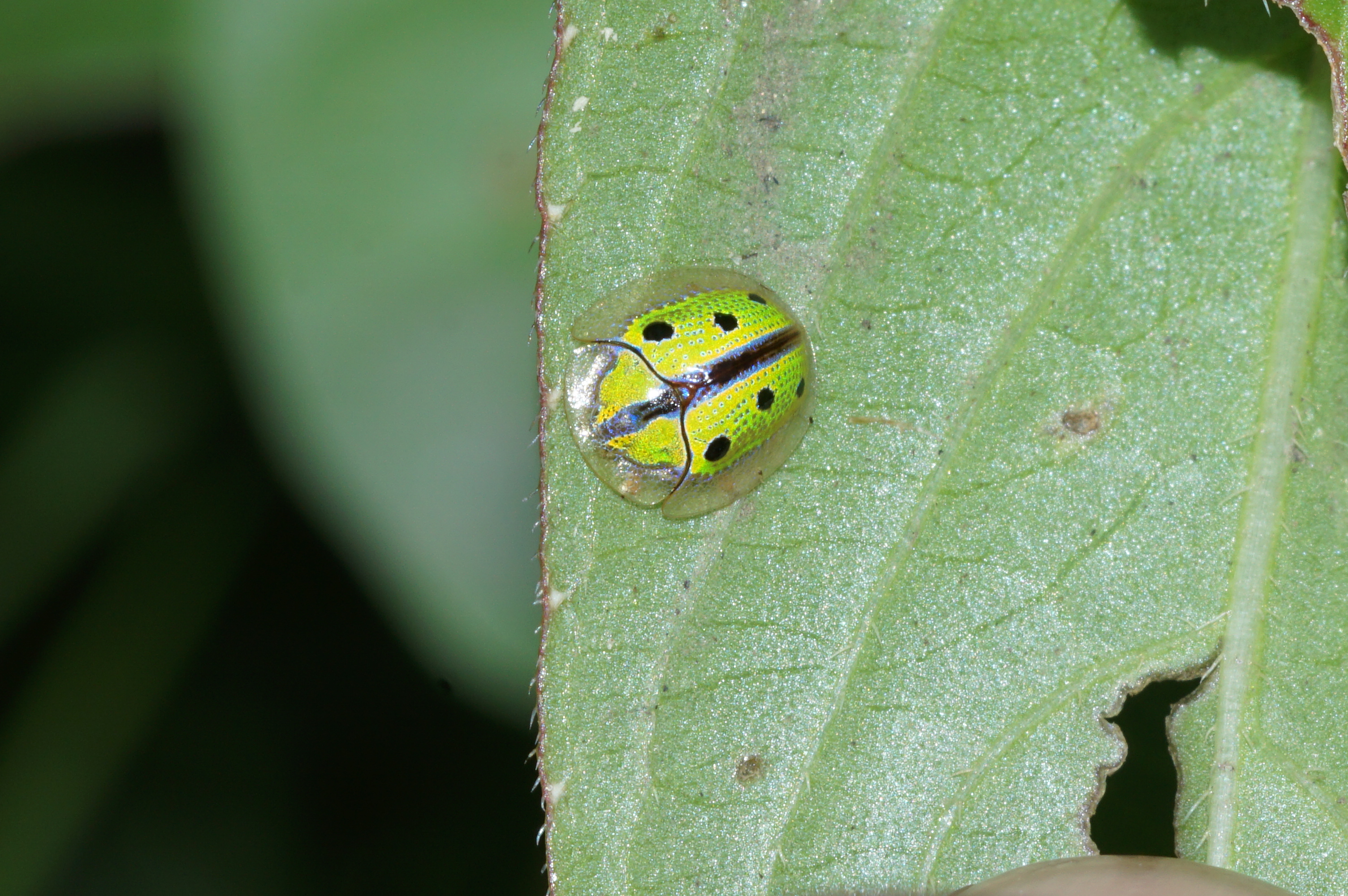

Scientific classification
- Kingdom: Animalia
- Phylum: Arthropoda
- Class: Insecta
- Order: Coleoptera
- Suborder: Polyphaga
- Infraorder: Cucujiformia
- Family: Chrysomelidae
- Genus: Chiridopsis
- Species: C. bipunctata

Binomial name
- Chiridopsis bipunctata (Linnaeus, 1767)

Synonyms
- Chiridopsis promiscua (Boheman, 1855); Chrysomela bipunctata Linnaeus, 1758; Cryptocephalus bipunctatus (Linnaeus, 1758); Cryptocephalus bipunctatus subsp. bipunctatus (Linnaeus, 1758); Cryptocephalus sanguinolentus var. cruciferae

= Chiridopsis bipunctata =

Species of beetle

Chiridopsis bipunctata, commonly known as Indian green tortoise beetle or sweetpotato tortoise beetle, is a species of leaf beetle found in India, Thailand and Sri Lanka. They are often seen on plants in the family Convolvulaceae.

== Gallery ==
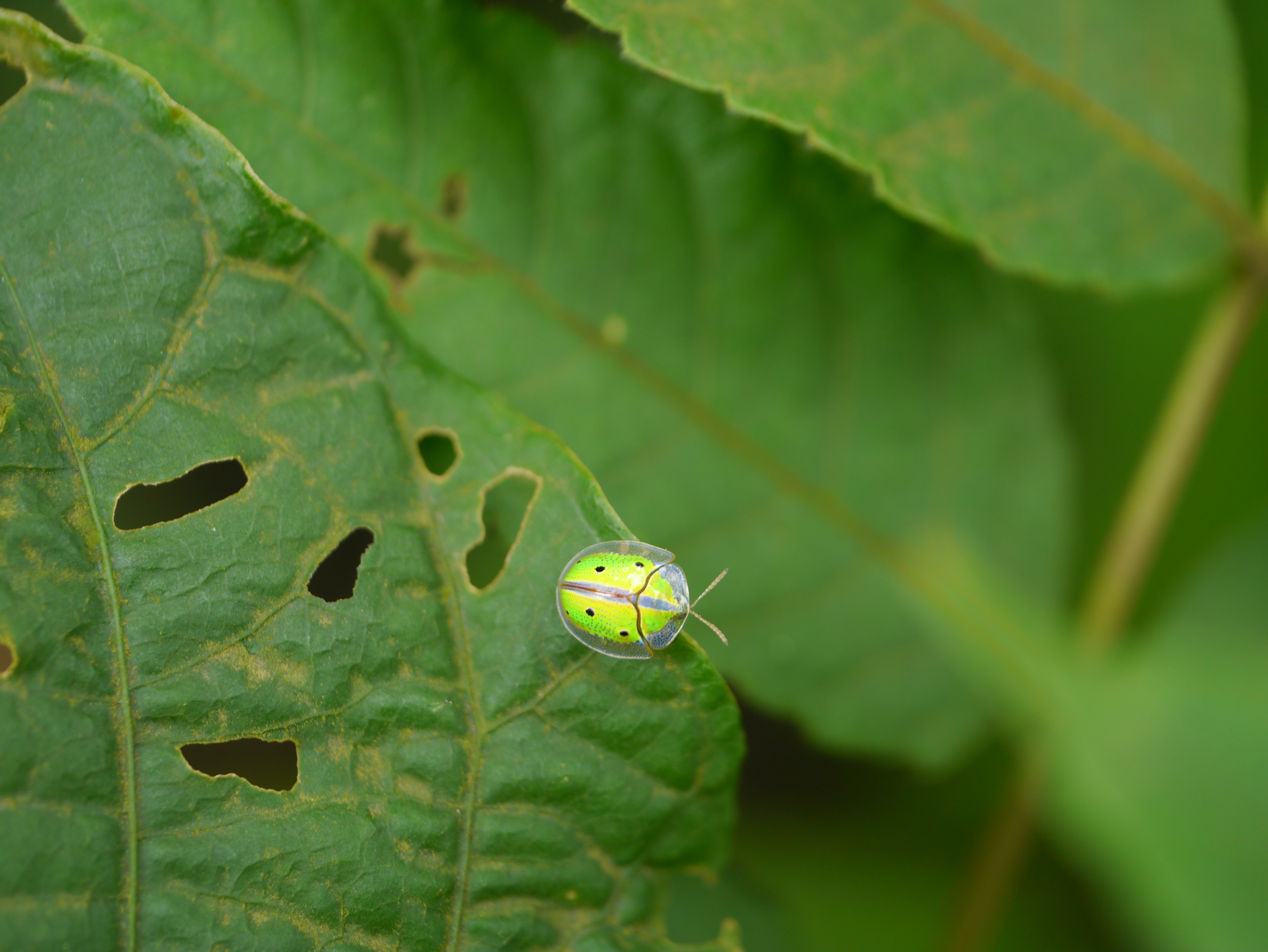

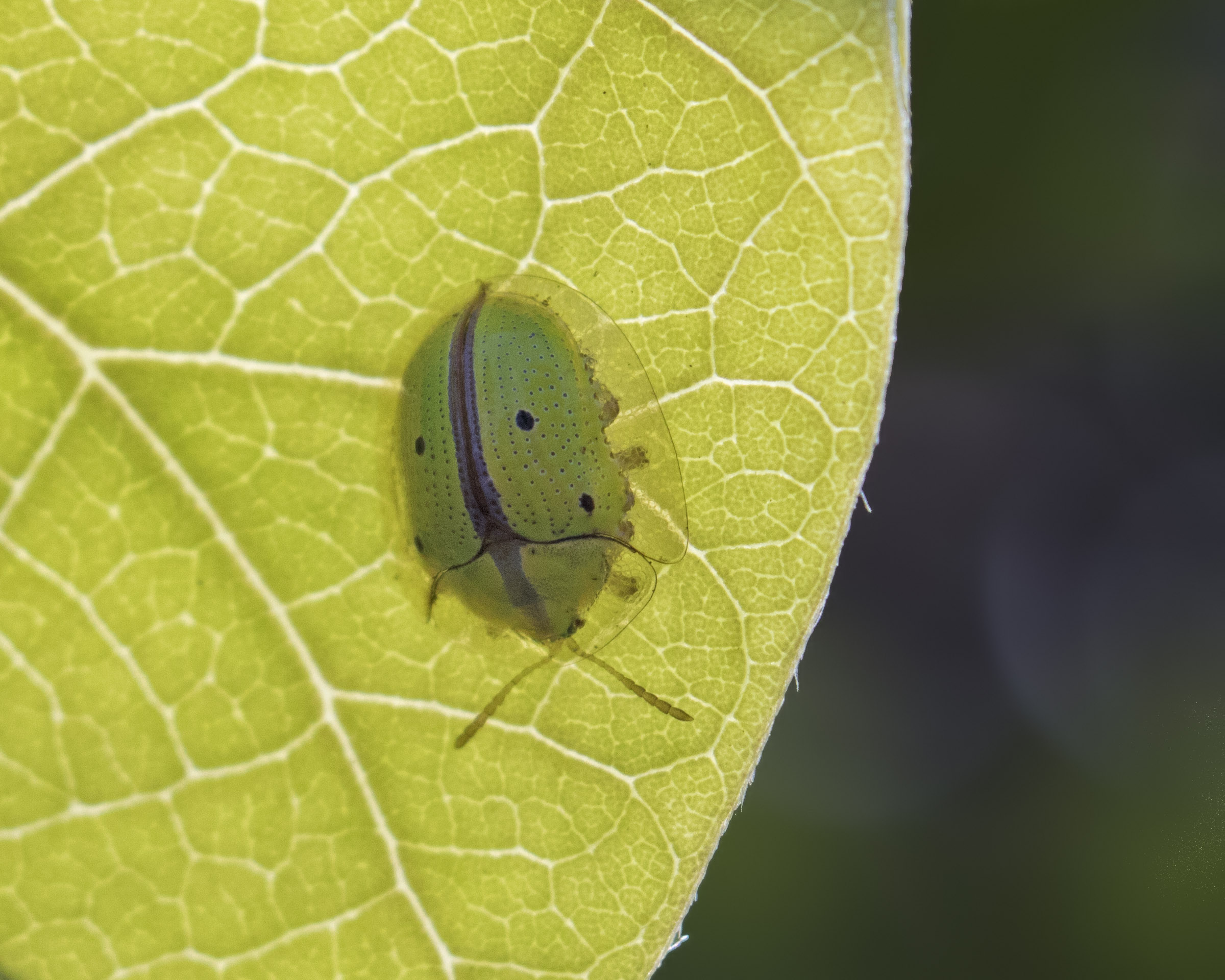
