= Setoclavine =

Names
- IUPAC name 6,8β-Dimethyl-9,10-didehydroergolin-8α-ol
- Systematic IUPAC name (6aR,9S)-7,9-Dimethyl-4,6,6a,7,8,9-hexahydroindolo[4,3-fg]quinolin-9-ol

Identifiers
CAS Number	519-12-0
3D model (JSmol)	Interactive image
ChemSpider	9657036
PubChem CID	11482216
UNII	UE9HT9P885
CompTox Dashboard (EPA)	DTXSID301256140
- InChI: InChI=1S/C16H18N2O/c1-16(19)7-12-11-4-3-5-13-15(11)10(8-17-13)6-14(12)18(2)9-16/h3-5,7-8,14,17,19H,6,9H2,1-2H3/t14-,16+/m1/s1 Key: BGVUWLLRNRBDAY-ZBFHGGJFSA-N
- SMILES: O[C@]3(/C=C2/c4cccc1c4c(c[nH]1)C[C@H]2N(C3)C)C

Properties
Chemical formula	C_{16}H_{18}N_{2}O
Molar mass	254.333 g·mol^{−1}
Appearance	prisms
Melting point	229 to 234 °C (444 to 453 °F; 502 to 507 K)
- Except where otherwise noted, data are given for materials in their standard state (at 25 °C [77 °F], 100 kPa). Infobox references

Setoclavine is an ergot alkaloid.
