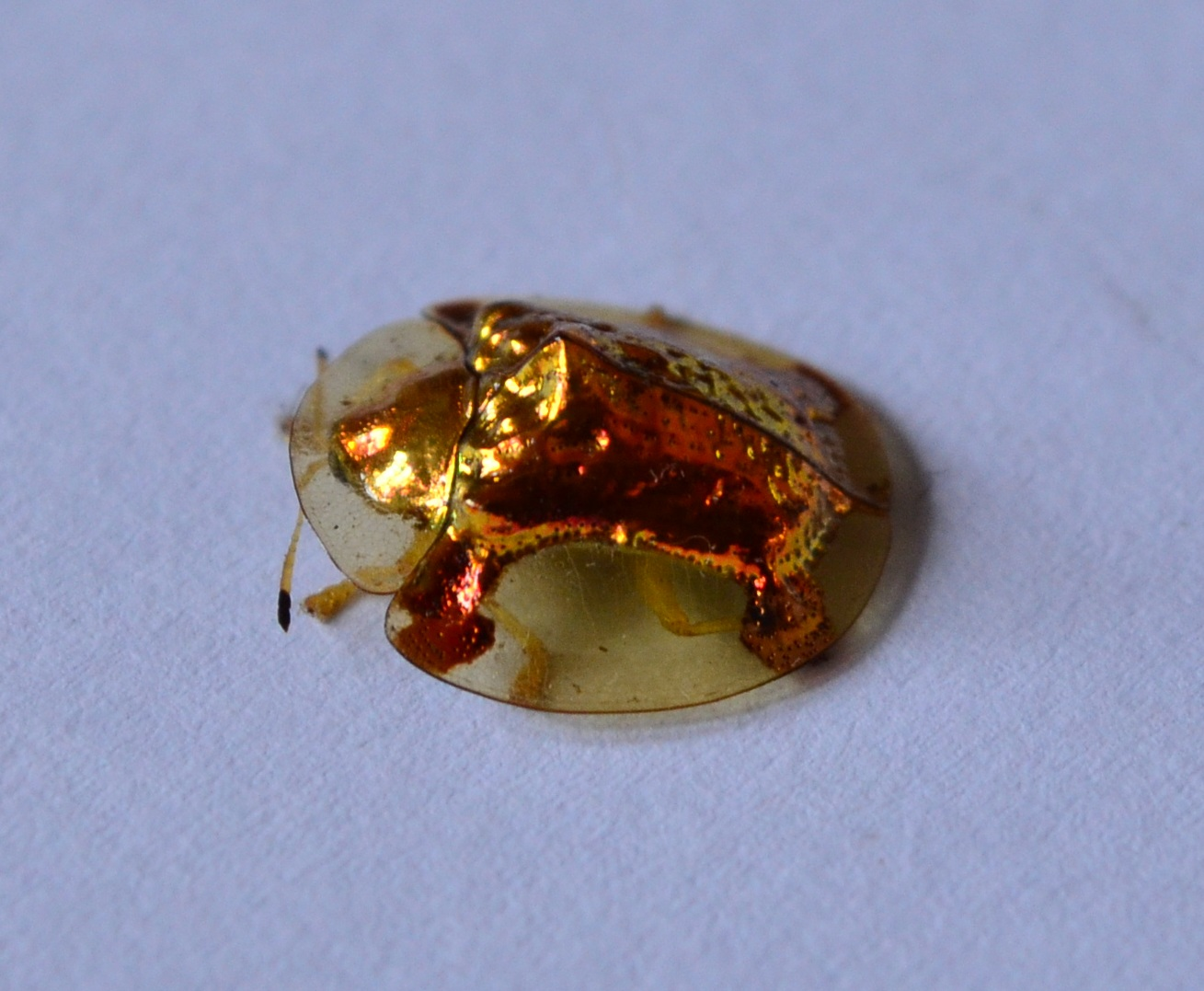
- Aspidimorpha sanctaecrucis (photo taken in Imphal)

Scientific classification
- Kingdom: Animalia
- Phylum: Arthropoda
- Clade: Pancrustacea
- Class: Insecta
- Order: Coleoptera
- Suborder: Polyphaga
- Infraorder: Cucujiformia
- Family: Chrysomelidae
- Tribe: Aspidimorphini
- Genus: Aspidimorpha; Hope, 1840

species
- see text

Synonyms
- Aspidomorpha Agassiz, 1848 (Lapsus calami)

= Aspidimorpha =

Genus of beetles

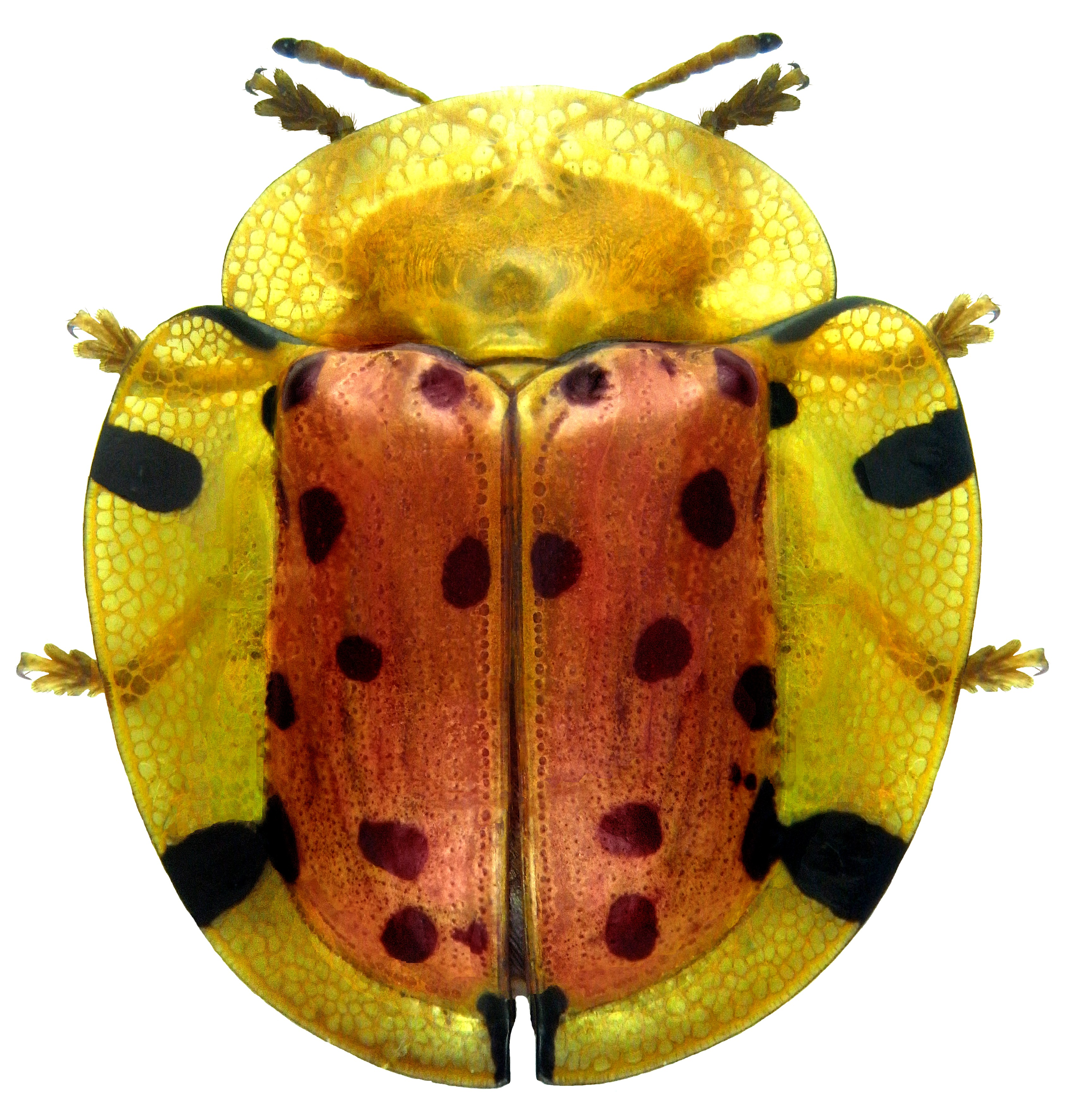
Aspidomorpha miliaris.

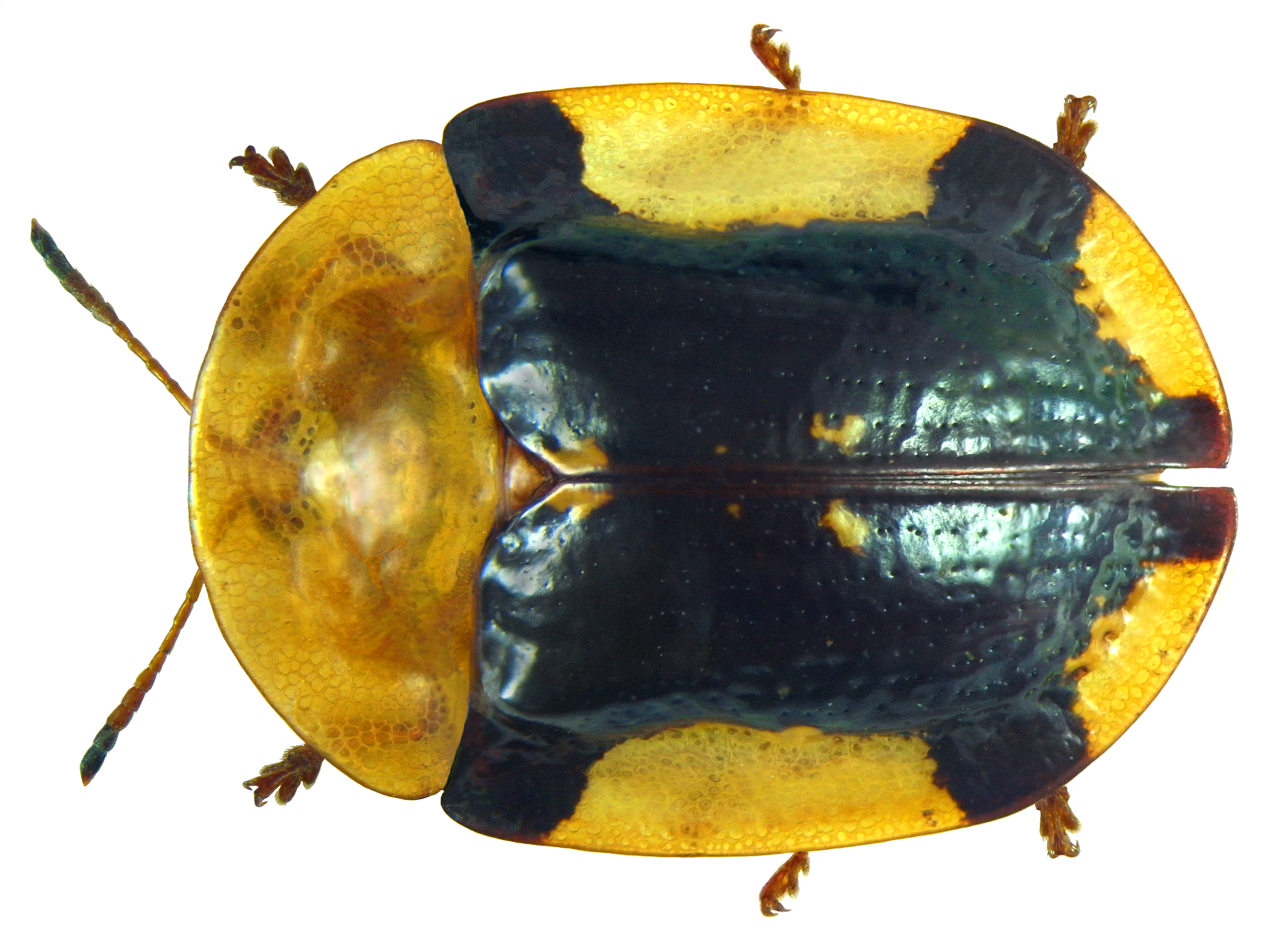
Aspidimorpha quinquefasciata.

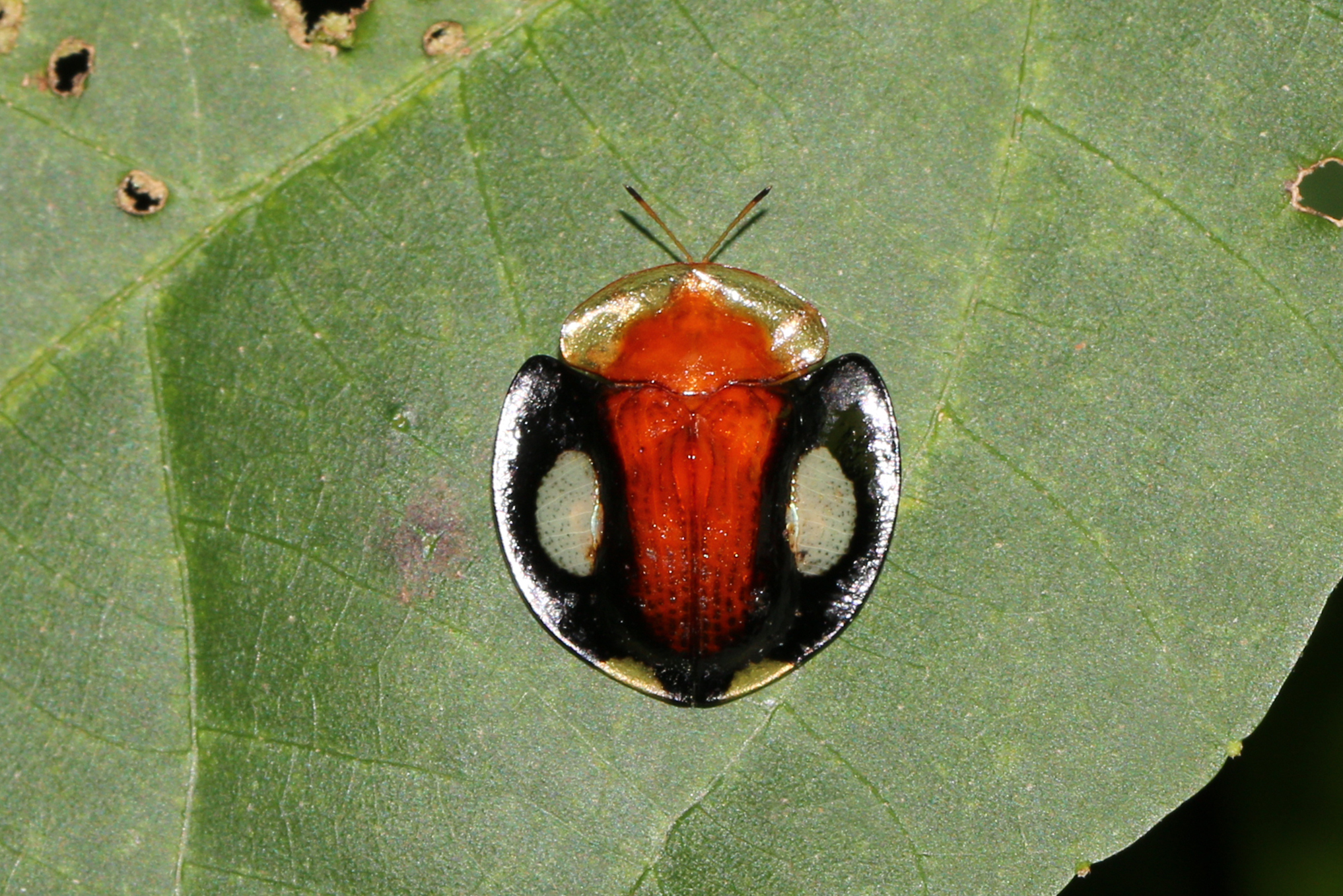
Aspidimorpha togata

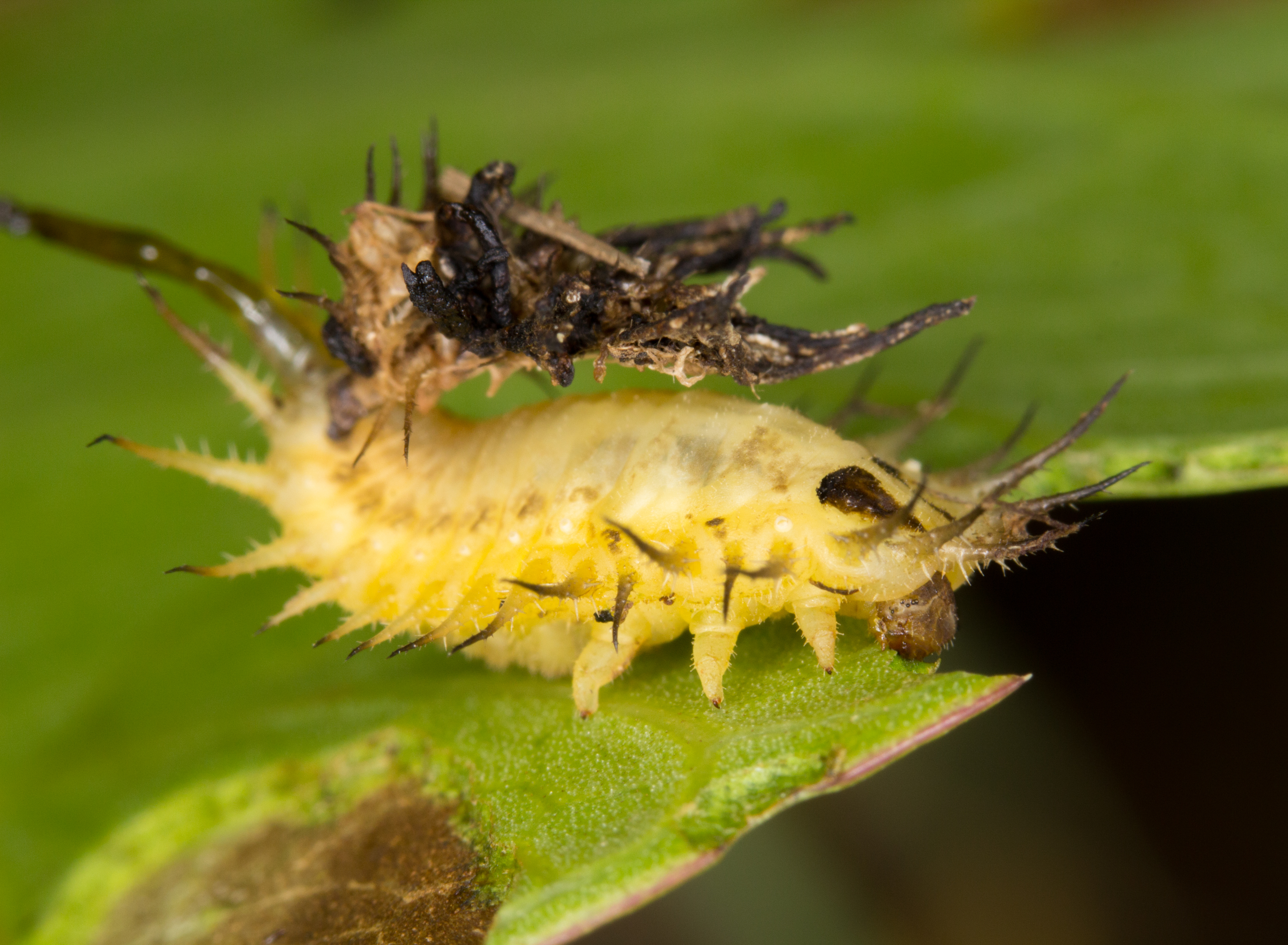
Aspidimorpha deusta, larva.

Aspidimorpha is a large Old World genus of beetles belonging to the family Chrysomelidae and tribe Aspidimorphini. The genus name is frequently misspelled as "Aspidomorpha", due to an unjustified spelling change in 1848.

== Species ==
BioLib includes:

subgenus Afroaspidimorpha Borowiec, 1997

- Aspidimorpha areata (Klug, 1835)
- Aspidimorpha fallaciosa (Fairmaire, 1904)
- Aspidimorpha loennbergi Spaeth, 1915
- Aspidimorpha longifrons Shaw, 1961
- Aspidimorpha multiguttata Spaeth, 1935
- Aspidimorpha nigripes Spaeth, 1926
- Aspidimorpha nigritarsis Spaeth, 1932
- Aspidimorpha nigromaculata (Herbst, 1799)
- Aspidimorpha polyspila Spaeth, 1911
- Aspidimorpha pseudoareata Borowiec, 1997
- Aspidimorpha rainoni Borowiec & Coache, 2018
- Aspidimorpha severini Spaeth, 1902
- Aspidimorpha virens Shaw, 1961

subgenus Aspidimorpha Hope, 1840

- Aspidimorpha adhaerens (Weber, 1801)
- Aspidimorpha adjecta Spaeth, 1940
- Aspidimorpha adumbrata Spaeth, 1917
- Aspidimorpha amabilis Boheman, 1854
- Aspidimorpha andrei Borowiec, 1997
- Aspidimorpha angoramensis Borowiec, 1992
- Aspidimorpha assimilis Boheman, 1854
- Aspidimorpha astraea Spaeth, 1917
- Aspidimorpha atrodorsata Borowiec, 1997
- Aspidimorpha aurata (Montrouzier, 1855)
- Aspidimorpha australasiae (Boisduval, 1835)
- Aspidimorpha bataviana Świętojańska, 2001
- Aspidimorpha bertiae Borowiec, 1997
- Aspidimorpha biguttata (Fabricius, 1775)
- Aspidimorpha bilobata Boheman, 1856
- Aspidimorpha bimaculata (Fabricius, 1792)
- Aspidimorpha biradiata Boheman, 1854
- Aspidimorpha biremis Boheman, 1854
- Aspidimorpha birmanica Spaeth, 1914
- Aspidimorpha castaneipennis Spaeth, 1912
- Aspidimorpha chandrika Maulik, 1918
- Aspidimorpha collarti Borowiec, 1997
- Aspidimorpha convolvuli (Boheman, 1862)
- Aspidimorpha corrugata Borowiec, 1997
- Aspidimorpha curtidens Hincks, 1962
- Aspidimorpha delitescens Weise, 1903
- Aspidimorpha densepicta Hincks, 1962
- Aspidimorpha deusta (Fabricius, 1775)
- Aspidimorpha diaphana (Sahlberg, 1823)
- Aspidimorpha difformis (Motschulsky, 1860)
- Aspidimorpha dilecta Boheman, 1854
- Aspidimorpha dissentanea Boheman, 1862
- Aspidimorpha dorsata (Fabricius, 1787)
- Aspidimorpha dulcicula Boheman, 1862
- Aspidimorpha elevata (Fabricius, 1801)
- Aspidimorpha equatoriensis Borowiec, 1986
- Aspidimorpha ertli Spaeth, 1906
- Aspidimorpha expansa Spaeth, 1917
- Aspidimorpha extumida Spaeth, 1915
- Aspidimorpha fabricii Sekerka, 2008
- Aspidimorpha fampanamboensis Borowiec, 1997
- Aspidimorpha fausta Spaeth, 1932
- Aspidimorpha fenestrata (Olivier, 1808)
- Aspidimorpha filiola Borowiec, 1997
- Aspidimorpha firma Weise, 1912
- Aspidimorpha flaviceps Borowiec, 1997
- Aspidimorpha furcata (Thunberg, 1789)
- Aspidimorpha fusca Shaw, 1961
- Aspidimorpha fusconotata Boheman, 1854
- Aspidimorpha fuscopunctata Boheman, 1854
- Aspidimorpha gruevi Borowiec, 1985
- Aspidimorpha hexaspilota Baly, 1863
- Aspidimorpha honesta Spaeth, 1902
- Aspidimorpha hyalina Spaeth, 1934
- Aspidimorpha icterica Boheman, 1854
- Aspidimorpha illustris Hincks, 1962
- Aspidimorpha incerta Borowiec, 1997
- Aspidimorpha indica Boheman, 1854
- Aspidimorpha indistincta Boheman, 1854
- Aspidimorpha infuscata Spaeth, 1909
- Aspidimorpha ingens Duvivier, 1891
- Aspidimorpha inquinata Boheman, 1854
- Aspidimorpha intermedia Świętojańska, 2001
- Aspidimorpha interrupta (Fabricius, 1775)
- Aspidimorpha intricata Weise, 1903
- Aspidimorpha inuncta Boheman, 1854
- Aspidimorpha isparetta Boheman, 1854
- Aspidimorpha karamojana Borowiec & Sekerka, 2010
- Aspidimorpha katangana Spaeth, 1932
- Aspidimorpha kilimana Weise, 1903
- Aspidimorpha laevigata Spaeth, 1905
- Aspidimorpha levissima Borowiec, 1997
- Aspidimorpha limbata (Goldfuss, 1805)
- Aspidimorpha limbipennis Boheman, 1854
- Aspidimorpha lobata Boheman, 1854
- Aspidimorpha luzonica Świętojańska, 2001
- Aspidimorpha lynesi Spaeth, 1937
- Aspidimorpha maculatissima (Boheman, 1856)
- Aspidimorpha madagascarica Boheman, 1854
- Aspidimorpha maffinbayensis Borowiec, 1992
- Aspidimorpha malaccana Spaeth, 1937
- Aspidimorpha miliaris (Fabricius, 1775)
- Aspidimorpha mirabilis Borowiec, 1997
- Aspidimorpha moluccana Spaeth, 1935
- Aspidimorpha mombonensis Weise, 1899
- Aspidimorpha montanella Borowiec, 1997
- Aspidimorpha mrogorensis Weise, 1899
- Aspidimorpha muehlei Borowiec, 1997
- Aspidimorpha musta Spaeth, 1914
- Aspidimorpha mutata Boheman, 1854
- Aspidimorpha mutilata Boheman, 1854
- Aspidimorpha natalensis Boheman, 1854
- Aspidimorpha nigropunctata (Klug, 1835)
- Aspidimorpha novaeguineensis (Boisduval, 1835)
- Aspidimorpha oblectans Spaeth, 1924
- Aspidimorpha obovata (Klug, 1835)
- Aspidimorpha obtusangula Spaeth, 1906
- Aspidimorpha obuduensis Borowiec, 1997
- Aspidimorpha officiosa Boheman, 1862
- Aspidimorpha orbicularis Boheman, 1854
- Aspidimorpha orbifera Spaeth, 1934
- Aspidimorpha orientalis Boheman, 1856
- Aspidimorpha pacalis Spaeth, 1926
- Aspidimorpha palleago Boheman, 1854
- Aspidimorpha pallescens Spaeth, 1917
- Aspidimorpha ponderosa Boheman, 1862
- Aspidimorpha pontifex Boheman, 1854
- Aspidimorpha potens Weise, 1903
- Aspidimorpha procax Spaeth, 1932
- Aspidimorpha proszynskii Borowiec, 1985
- Aspidimorpha punctum (Fabricius, 1801)
- Aspidimorpha quadrilobata Boheman, 1856
- Aspidimorpha quadriradiata Boheman, 1854
- Aspidimorpha quadriramosa Boheman, 1854
- Aspidimorpha quadriremis (Gyllenhal, 1808)
- Aspidimorpha quinquefasciata (Fabricius, 1801)
- Aspidimorpha reflexa Spaeth, 1917
- Aspidimorpha rubroornata Borowiec, 1997
- Aspidimorpha sanctaecrucis (Fabricius, 1792)
- Aspidimorpha sankuruensis Borowiec, 1997
- Aspidimorpha sarasinorum Spaeth, 1932
- Aspidimorpha sarawacensis Spaeth, 1904
- Aspidimorpha sassii Borowiec, 1997
- Aspidimorpha semiramosa Wagener, 1880
- Aspidimorpha sessarum Spaeth, 1911
- Aspidimorpha setosa Borowiec, 1997
- Aspidimorpha silfverbergi Borowiec, 1985
- Aspidimorpha sjoestedti Spaeth, 1903
- Aspidimorpha snizeki Świętojańska, 2001
- Aspidimorpha splendidula Spaeth, 1961
- Aspidimorpha sternalis Weise, 1896
- Aspidimorpha stevensi Baly, 1863
- Aspidimorpha strigosa (Gorham, 1892)
- Aspidimorpha suavis Spaeth, 1912
- Aspidimorpha subcruciata Boheman, 1854
- Aspidimorpha submutata Weise, 1899
- Aspidimorpha sulawesica Świętojańska, 2001
- Aspidimorpha sulfuripennis Spaeth, 1932
- Aspidimorpha sumbavaensis Świętojańska & Borowiec, 2013
- Aspidimorpha tamdaoensis Świętojańska, 2001
- Aspidimorpha tanganikana Spaeth, 1916
- Aspidimorpha tibetana Świętojańska & Borowiec, 2006
- Aspidimorpha timorensis Świętojańska, 2001
- Aspidimorpha togata Thomson, 1858
- Aspidimorpha togoensis Weise, 1904
- Aspidimorpha tortuosa Boheman, 1862
- Aspidimorpha toxopei Spaeth, 1926
- Aspidimorpha transparipennis (Motschulsky, 1860)
- Aspidimorpha tuberosa Borowiec, 1997
- Aspidimorpha uelensis Spaeth, 1932
- Aspidimorpha uluguruensis Borowiec, 1997
- Aspidimorpha undulatipennis Spaeth, 1911
- Aspidimorpha vernicata Fairmaire, 1901
- Aspidimorpha wagneri Borowiec & Sekerka, 2014
- Aspidimorpha wahlbergi Boheman, 1854
- Aspidimorpha westwoodi (Boheman, 1854)

subgenus Aspidocassis Borowiec, 1997

- Aspidimorpha apicalis (Klug, 1833)
- Aspidimorpha confinis (Klug, 1835)
- Aspidimorpha hiekei Borowiec, 1997
- Aspidimorpha tanolaensis Borowiec, 1997

subgenus Dianaspis Chen & Zia, 1984

- Aspidimorpha denticollis Spaeth, 1932

subgenus Megaspidomorpha Hincks, 1952

- Aspidimorpha angolensis Weise, 1896
- Aspidimorpha chlorotica (Olivier, 1808)
- Aspidimorpha puncticosta Boheman, 1854

subgenus Neoaspidimorpha Borowiec, 1992

- Aspidimorpha septemcostata Wagener, 1881

subgenus Semiaspidimorpha Borowiec, 1997

- Aspidimorpha chlorina Boheman, 1854
- Aspidimorpha fatua Spaeth, 1917
- Aspidimorpha irrorata Weise, 1898
- Aspidimorpha kasaiensis Spaeth, 1932
- Aspidimorpha kolbei Weise, 1899
- Aspidimorpha pseudochlorina Borowiec, 1986
- Aspidimorpha salazarensis Borowiec, 1997
- Aspidimorpha viridula Weise, 1903

subgenus Spaethia Berg, 1899

- Aspidimorpha alluaudi Spaeth, 1924
- Aspidimorpha cepaecolor (Fairmaire, 1898)
- Aspidimorpha citrina Spaeth, 1934
- Aspidimorpha exacta Spaeth, 1932
- Aspidimorpha ganglbaueri (Spaeth, 1898)
- Aspidimorpha gausapina Spaeth, 1924
- Aspidimorpha heroni Borowiec, 1997
- Aspidimorpha pellucida Weise, 1899
- Aspidimorpha scalena Spaeth, 1917
- Aspidimorpha siticulosa Spaeth, 1917
- Aspidimorpha socrus Spaeth, 1917
- Aspidimorpha zambiana Borowiec, 2006

subgenus Spaethiomorpha Borowiec, 1997

- Aspidimorpha haefligeri Spaeth, 1906

subgenus Weiseocassis Spaeth, 1932

- Aspidimorpha sculpturata Borowiec, 1997
- Aspidimorpha striata Weise, 1896
