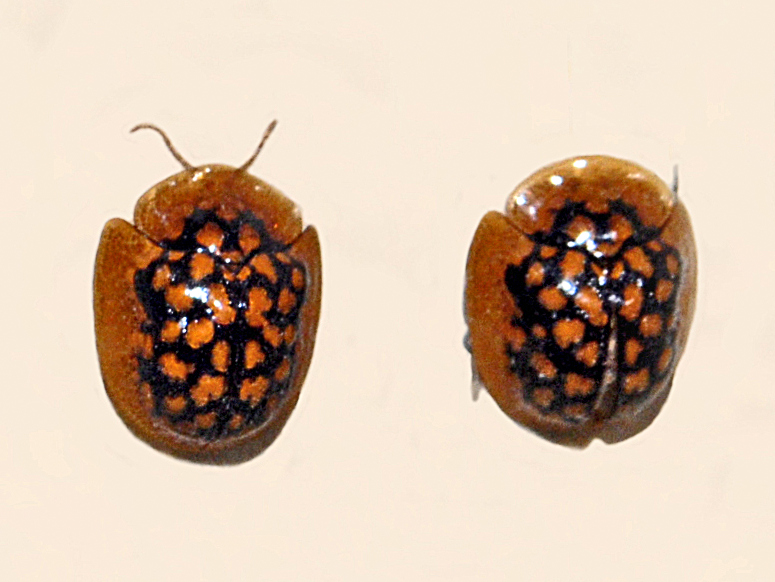
- Chiridopsis punctata

Scientific classification
- Kingdom: Animalia
- Phylum: Arthropoda
- Clade: Pancrustacea
- Class: Insecta
- Order: Coleoptera
- Suborder: Polyphaga
- Infraorder: Cucujiformia
- Family: Chrysomelidae
- Genus: Chiridopsis; Spaeth, 1922

= Chiridopsis =

Genus of beetles

Chiridopsis is a genus of African, Palaearctic and Oriental leaf beetles belonging to the family Chrysomelidae.

== Selected species ==
- Chiridopsis atricollis Borowiec, 2005
- Chiridopsis aubei (Boheman, 1855)
- Chiridopsis bipunctata (Linnaeus 1767)
- Chiridopsis boutereli Spaeth, 1917
- Chiridopsis defecta Medvedev & Eroshkina, 1988
- Chiridopsis ghatei Borowiec & Swietojanska, 2000
- Chiridopsis levis Borowiec, 2005
- Chiridopsis maculata Borowiec, 2005
- Chiridopsis marginepunctata Borowiec, 2005
- Chiridopsis nigropunctata Borowiec & Ghate, 1999
- Chiridopsis nigroreticulata Borowiec, 2005
- Chiridopsis nigrosepta (Fairmaire, 1891)
- Chiridopsis punctata (Weber, 1801
- Chiridopsis rubromaculata Borowiec, Ranade, Rane & Ghate, 2001
- Chiridopsis spadix Spaeth, 1917
