= Lysergene =

Names
- IUPAC name 6-Methyl-8-methylidene-9,10-didehydroergoline
- Systematic IUPAC name (6aR)-7-Methyl-9-methylidene-4,6,6a,7,8,9-hexahydroindolo[4,3-fg]quinoline
- Other names Lysergen; 9,10-Didehydro-6-methyl-8-methylene-ergoline

Identifiers
CAS Number	478-91-1
3D model (JSmol)	Interactive image
ChemSpider	10390293
PubChem CID	12312578
UNII	553QH53YND
CompTox Dashboard (EPA)	DTXSID30197290
- InChI: InChI=1S/C16H16N2/c1-10-6-13-12-4-3-5-14-16(12)11(8-17-14)7-15(13)18(2)9-10/h3-6,8,15,17H,1,7,9H2,2H3/t15-/m1/s1 Key: MVCNPXUMKZNDRO-OAHLLOKOSA-N
- SMILES: CN1CC(=C)C=C2[C@H]1CC3=CNC4=CC=CC2=C34

Properties
Chemical formula	C_{16}H_{16}N_{2}
Molar mass	236.318 g·mol^{−1}
- Except where otherwise noted, data are given for materials in their standard state (at 25 °C [77 °F], 100 kPa). Infobox references

Lysergene, also known as 6-methyl-8-methylidene-9,10-didehydroergoline, is an ergot alkaloid.

== See also ==
- Substituted ergoline
- Lysergine
