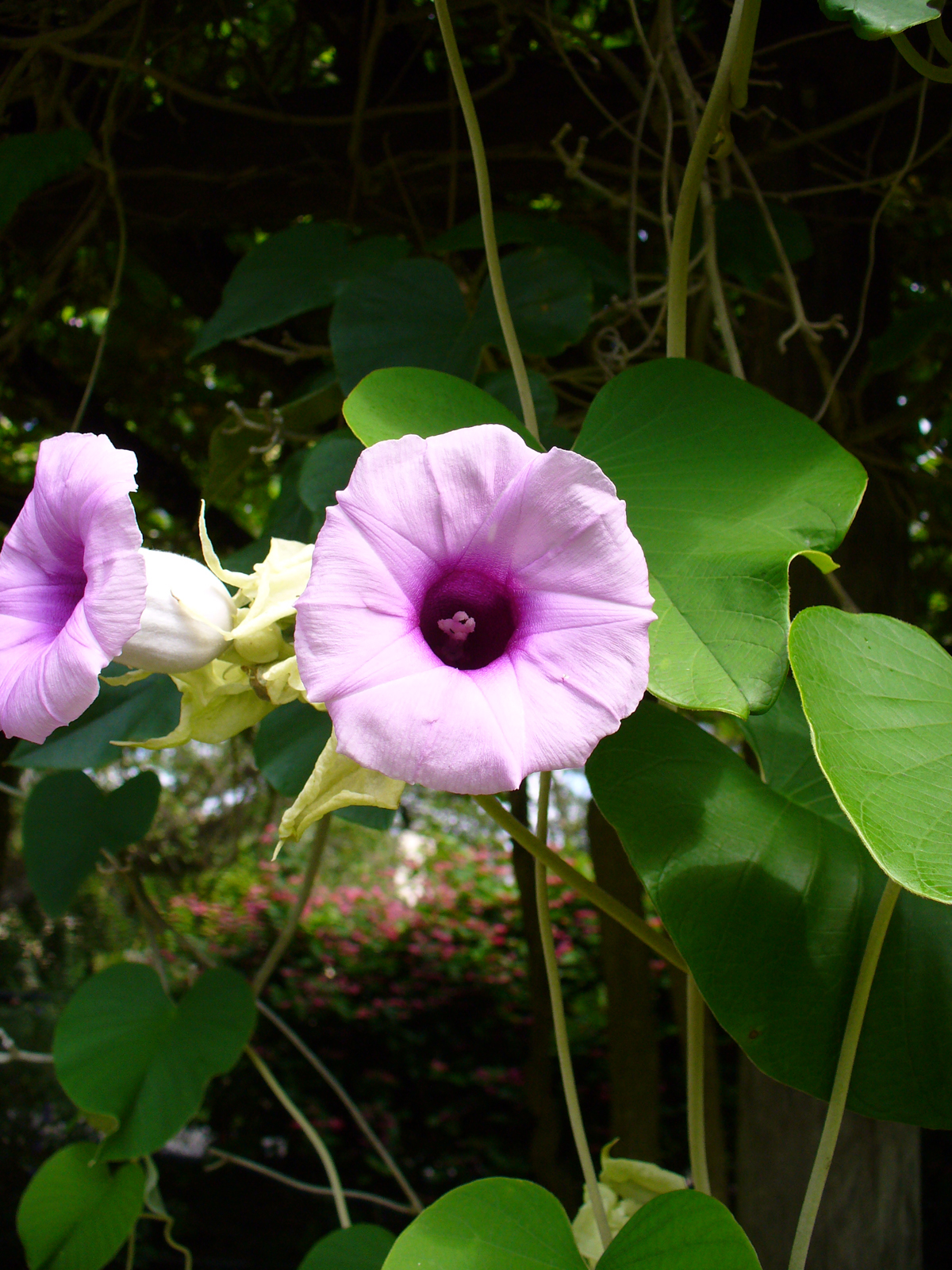
- Argyreia nervosa

Scientific classification
- Kingdom: Plantae
- Clade: Tracheophytes
- Clade: Angiosperms
- Clade: Eudicots
- Clade: Asterids
- Order: Solanales
- Family: Convolvulaceae
- Tribe: Ipomoeeae
- Genus: Argyreia; Lour., 1790.

Type species
- Argyreia obtusifolia Lour.

Synonyms
- Cryptanthela Gagnep.; Lettsomia Roxb.; Moorcroftia Choisy; Samudra Raf.

= Argyreia =

Genus of flowering plants

Argyreia is a genus of plants in the family Convolvulaceae.

== Species ==
The following species are recognised in the genus Argyreia:

- Argyreia adpressa (Choisy) Boerl.
- Argyreia akoensis S.Z.Yang, P.H.Chen & Staples
- Argyreia albiflora Staples & Traiperm
- Argyreia androyensis Deroin
- Argyreia ankylophlebia Traiperm & Staples
- Argyreia apoensis (Elmer) Ooststr.
- Argyreia arakuensis N.P.Balakr.
- Argyreia argentea (Roxb.) Sweet
- Argyreia atropurpurea (Wall.) Raizada
- Argyreia baoshanensis S.H.Huang
- Argyreia barbata (Wall.) Raizada
- Argyreia barbigera Choisy
- Argyreia barnesii (Merr.) Ooststr.
- Argyreia baronii Deroin
- Argyreia bella (C.B.Clarke) Raizada
- Argyreia bifrons Ooststr.
- Argyreia boholensis (Merr.) Ooststr.
- Argyreia boseana Santapau & Patel
- Argyreia bracteata Choisy
- Argyreia bracteosa (C.B.Clarke) Raizada
- Argyreia breviscapa (Kerr) Ooststr.
- Argyreia capitiformis (Poir.) Ooststr.
- Argyreia caudata Ooststr.
- Argyreia celebica Ooststr.
- Argyreia cheliensis C.Y.Wu
- Argyreia cinerea Ooststr.
- Argyreia coacta (C.B.Clarke) Alston
- Argyreia collinsiae (Craib) Na Songkhla & Traiperm
- Argyreia confusa (Prain) Thoth.
- Argyreia congesta Ooststr.
- Argyreia coonoorensis W.W.Sm. & Ramaswami
- Argyreia corneri Hoogland
- Argyreia crispa Ooststr.
- Argyreia cucullata Ooststr.
- Argyreia cuneata (Willd.) Ker Gawl.
- Argyreia cymosa (Roxb.) Sweet
- Argyreia daltonii C.B.Clarke
- Argyreia discolor Ooststr.
- Argyreia dokmaihom Traiperm & Staples
- Argyreia elliptica (Roth) Choisy
- Argyreia elongata Forman
- Argyreia erinacea Ooststr.
- Argyreia eriocephala C.Y.Wu
- Argyreia formosana Ishig. ex T.Yamaz.
- Argyreia fulgens Choisy
- Argyreia fulvocymosa C.Y.Wu
- Argyreia fulvovillosa C.Y.Wu & S.H.Huang
- Argyreia glabra Choisy
- Argyreia hancorniifolia Gardner ex Thwaites
- Argyreia henryi (Craib) Craib
- Argyreia hirsuta Wight & Arn.
- Argyreia hirsutissima (C.B.Clarke) Thoth.
- Argyreia hookeri C.B.Clarke
- Argyreia hylophila (Kerr) Staples & Traiperm
- Argyreia inaequisepala Traiperm & Staples
- Argyreia involucrata C.B.Clarke
- Argyreia ionantha (Kerr) Khunwasi & Traiperm
- Argyreia kerrii Craib
- Argyreia kleiniana (Schult.) Raizada
- Argyreia kondaparthiensis P.Daniel & Vajr.
- Argyreia kunstleri (Prain) Ooststr.
- Argyreia kurzii (C.B.Clarke) Boerl.
- Argyreia lamii Ooststr.
- Argyreia lanceolata Choisy
- Argyreia laotica Gagnep.
- Argyreia lawii C.B.Clarke
- Argyreia leschenaultii Choisy
- Argyreia leucantha Traiperm & Staples
- Argyreia linggaensis Ooststr.
- Argyreia longifolia (Collett & Hemsl.) Raizada
- Argyreia longipes (Gagnep.) Traiperm & Staples
- Argyreia luzonensis (Hallier f.) Ooststr.
- Argyreia maingayi (C.B.Clarke) Hoogland
- Argyreia marlipoensis C.Y.Wu & S.H.Huang
- Argyreia mastersii (Prain) Raizada
- Argyreia maymyensis (Lace) Raizada
- Argyreia mekongensis Gagnep. & Courchet
- Argyreia melvillei (S.Moore) Staples
- Argyreia micrantha Ooststr.
- Argyreia mollis (Burm.f.) Choisy
- Argyreia monglaensis C.Y.Wu & S.H.Huang
- Argyreia monosperma C.Y.Wu
- Argyreia nana (Collett & Hemsl.) S.Shalini, Lakshmin. & D.Maity
- Argyreia nellygherya Choisy
- Argyreia nervosa (Burm.f.) Bojer
- Argyreia nitida (Desr.) Choisy
- Argyreia nuda Ooststr.
- Argyreia oblongifolia Ooststr.
- Argyreia obtusifolia Lour.
- Argyreia onilahiensis Deroin
- Argyreia ooststroomii Hoogland
- Argyreia osyrensis (Roth) Choisy
- Argyreia paivae A.R.Simões & P.Silveira
- Argyreia pallida Choisy
- Argyreia parviflora (Ridl.) Ooststr.
- Argyreia paucinervia Ooststr.
- Argyreia pedicellata Ooststr.
- Argyreia penangiana (Choisy) Boerl.
- Argyreia philippinensis (Merr.) Ooststr.
- Argyreia pierreana Bois
- Argyreia pilosa Wight & Arn.
- Argyreia popahensis (Collett & Hemsl.) Staples
- Argyreia pseudorubicunda Ooststr.
- Argyreia reinwardtiana (Blume) Miq.
- Argyreia reticulata (Prain) Hoogland
- Argyreia ridleyi (Prain) Ooststr.
- Argyreia robinsonii (Ridl.) Ooststr.
- Argyreia roseopurpurea (Kerr) Ooststr.
- Argyreia roxburghii (Sweet) Choisy
- Argyreia rubicunda Choisy
- Argyreia samarensis Ooststr.
- Argyreia scortechinii (Prain) Prain ex Hoogl.
- Argyreia sericea Dalzell & A.Gibson
- Argyreia setosa (Roxb.) Sweet
- Argyreia sharatchanderji
- Argyreia siamensis (Craib) Staples
- Argyreia sikkimensis C.B.Clarke) Ooststr.
- Argyreia sorsogonensis Ooststr. ex Staples & Traiperm
- Argyreia sphaerocephala (Prain) Prain ex Hoogl.
- Argyreia splendens (Hornem.) Sweet
- Argyreia srinivasanii Subba Rao & Kumari
- Argyreia stenophylla (Kerr) Staples & Traiperm
- Argyreia strigillosa C.Y.Wu
- Argyreia suddeeana Traiperm & Staples
- Argyreia sumbawana Ooststr.
- Argyreia thomsonii (C.B.Clarke) Babu
- Argyreia thorelii Gagnep.
- Argyreia thwaitesii (C.B.Clarke) D.F.Austin
- Argyreia tomentosa Choisy
- Argyreia vahibora Deroin
- Argyreia variabilis Traiperm & Staples
- Argyreia velutina C.Y.Wu
- Argyreia venusta Choisy
- Argyreia versicolor (Kerr) Staples & Traiperm
- Argyreia wallichii Choisy
- Argyreia walshae Ooststr.
- Argyreia zeylanica (Gaertn.) Voigt
