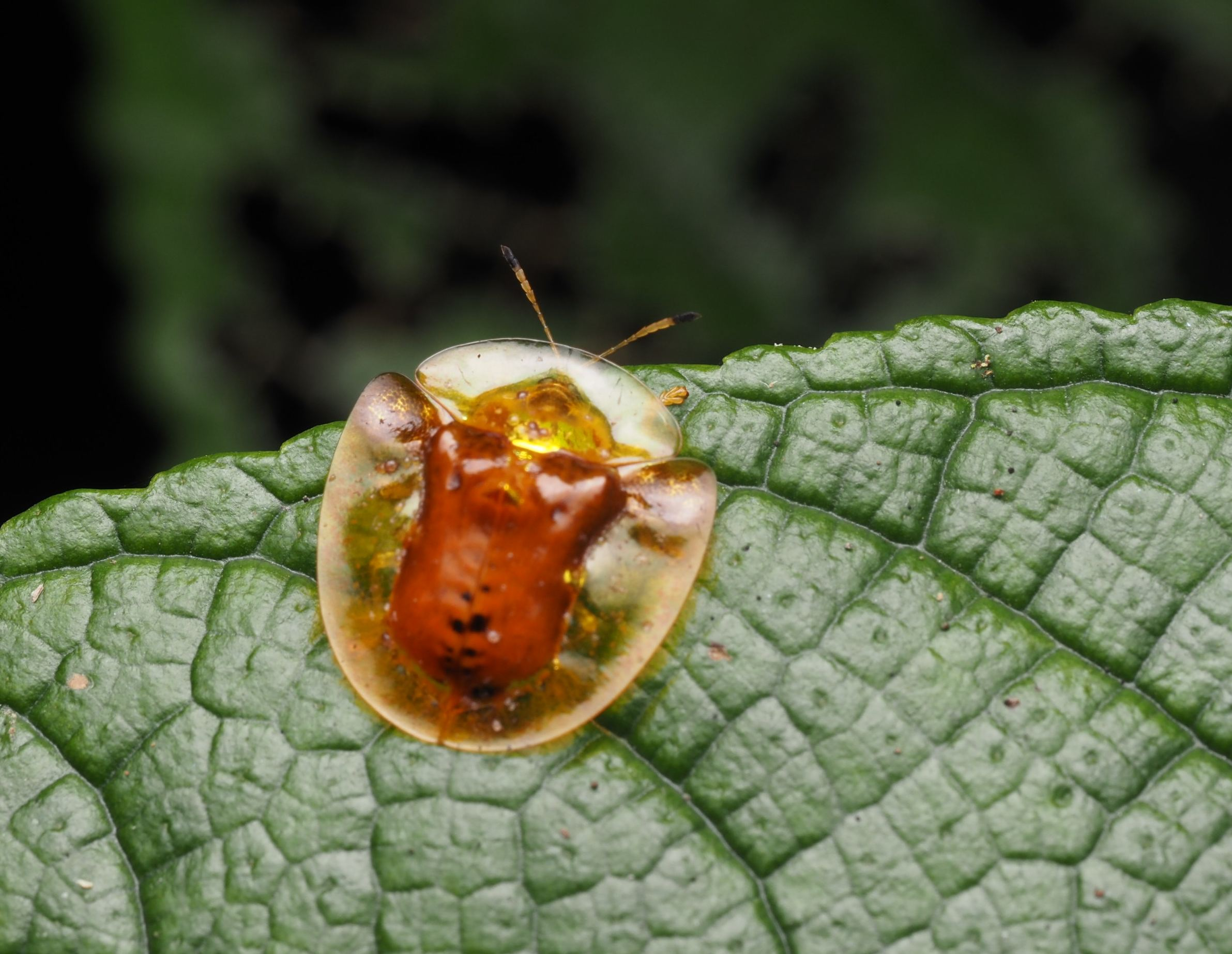

Scientific classification
- Kingdom: Animalia
- Phylum: Arthropoda
- Clade: Pancrustacea
- Class: Insecta
- Order: Coleoptera
- Suborder: Polyphaga
- Infraorder: Cucujiformia
- Family: Chrysomelidae
- Genus: Aspidimorpha
- Species: A. furcata

Binomial name
- Aspidimorpha furcata (Thunberg, 1789)

Synonyms
- Aspidimorpha indica Boheman, 1854; Aspidomorpha indica (Boheman, 1775); Cassida furcata Thunberg, 1789; Cassida dorsata Olivier, 1790; Cassida micans Fabricius, 1801

= Aspidimorpha furcata =

Species of beetle

Aspidimorpha dorsata, commonly known as golden tortoise beetle or furcated tortoise beetle, is a species of leaf beetle widely distributed in Oriental region from Sri Lanka to South China towards Java, and Borneo.

== Biology ==
After mating, the adult female lays about 150 eggs over a period of 70 to 80 days. Grub stage is about 8 to 9 days and the pupal stage is about 4 days. The species use many Ipomoea species as the host plants.

== Host plants ==
- Argyreia hookeri
- Argyreia nervosa
- Calystegia
- Convolvulus nummularis
- Evolvulus alsinoides
- Ipomoea aquatica
- Ipomoea batatas
- Ipomoea cairica
- Ipomoea coccinea
- Ipomoea digitata
- Ipomoea excavata
- Ipomoea fistulosa
- Ipomoea hederacea
- Ipomoea hispida
- Ipomoea indica
- Ipomoea obscura
- Ipomoea palmata
- Ipomoea pestigridis
- Ipomoea pilosa
- Ipomoea tuberosa
- Ipomoea violacea
- Lettsomia elliptica
- Merremia emarginata
- Merremia tridentata
- Merremia umbellata
