= Chanoclavine =

Names
- IUPAC name [9(9a)E]-9-Methyl-9,9a-didehydro-7,8-seco-9a-homoergolin-8-ol
- Systematic IUPAC name (2E)-2-Methyl-3-[(4R,5R)-4-(methylamino)-1,3,4,5-tetrahydrobenzo[cd]indol-5-yl]prop-2-en-1-ol
- Other names chanoclavin-l

Identifiers
CAS Number	2390-99-0
3D model (JSmol)	Interactive image
ChemSpider	4444739
PubChem CID	5281381
UNII	32X6F73RE2
CompTox Dashboard (EPA)	DTXSID50893242
- InChI: InChI=1S/C16H20N2O/c1-10(9-19)6-13-12-4-3-5-14-16(12)11(8-18-14)7-15(13)17-2/h3-6,8,13,15,17-19H,7,9H2,1-2H3/b10-6+/t13-,15-/m1/s1 Key: SAHHMCVYMGARBT-HEESEWQSSA-N; InChI=1/C16H20N2O/c1-10(9-19)6-13-12-4-3-5-14-16(12)11(8-18-14)7-15(13)17-2/h3-6,8,13,15,17-19H,7,9H2,1-2H3/b10-6+/t13-,15-/m1/s1 Key: SAHHMCVYMGARBT-HEESEWQSBR
- SMILES: C/C(=C\[C@H]1[C@@H](CC2=CNC3=CC=CC1=C23)NC)/CO

Properties
Chemical formula	C_{16}H_{20}N_{2}O
Molar mass	256.34 g/mol
- Except where otherwise noted, data are given for materials in their standard state (at 25 °C [77 °F], 100 kPa). Infobox references

Chanoclavine, also known as chanoclavin-I, is a tricyclic ergot alkaloid (ergoline) isolate of certain fungi. It is mainly produced by members of the genus Claviceps. Long used in traditional Chinese medicine, it was found in 1987 mouse studies to stimulate dopamine D_{2} receptors in the brain. It is described as being devoid of ergot-like activity, possessing no outstanding pharmacological activity, and as not contributing to the hallucinogenic effects of morning glory seeds.

== See also ==
- Chanoclavine II
- Chanoclavine-I dehydrogenase
- Morning glory (drug)
