= Ergometrinine =

Names
- IUPAC name N-[(2S)-1-Hydroxypropan-2-yl]-6-methyl-9,10-didehydroergoline-8α-carboxamide
- Systematic IUPAC name (6aR,9S)-N-[(2S)-1-Hydroxypropan-2-yl]-7-methyl-4,6,6a,7,8,9-hexahydroindolo[4,3-fg]quinoline-9-carboxamide
- Other names Ergobasinin, Ergobasinine, Ergometrinin, Ergonovinine, Isoergometrine

Identifiers
CAS Number	479-00-5
3D model (JSmol)	Interactive image
ChemSpider	4588887
PubChem CID	5486180
UNII	5EXN22NGMW
CompTox Dashboard (EPA)	DTXSID90893241
- InChI: InChI=1S/C19H23N3O2/c1-11(10-23)21-19(24)13-6-15-14-4-3-5-16-18(14)12(8-20-16)7-17(15)22(2)9-13/h3-6,8,11,13,17,20,23H,7,9-10H2,1-2H3,(H,21,24)/t11-,13-,17+/m0/s1 Key: WVVSZNPYNCNODU-PLQHRBFRSA-N
- SMILES: C[C@@H](CO)NC(=O)[C@@H]1CN([C@@H]2CC3=CNC4=CC=CC(=C34)C2=C1)C

Properties
Chemical formula	C_{19}H_{23}N_{3}O_{2}
Molar mass	325.412 g·mol^{−1}
- Except where otherwise noted, data are given for materials in their standard state (at 25 °C [77 °F], 100 kPa). Infobox references

Ergometrinine is an ergot alkaloid. It is the l-isomer of ergometrine. Only the d-isomers of lysergamides are said to be active as psychedelics.

== See also ==
- Substituted lysergamide
- Isoergine
