= Chanoclavine II =

Names
- Preferred IUPAC name (2E)-2-Methyl-3-[(4R,5S)-4-(methylamino)-1,3,4,5-tetrahydrobenzo[cd]indol-5-yl]prop-2-en-1-ol

Identifiers
CAS Number	1466-08-6
3D model (JSmol)	Interactive image
ChemSpider	32702224
PubChem CID	15559894
UNII	3ZLN2ZRI6Q
CompTox Dashboard (EPA)	DTXSID10932863
- InChI: InChI=1S/C16H20N2O/c1-10(9-19)6-13-12-4-3-5-14-16(12)11(8-18-14)7-15(13)17-2/h3-6,8,13,15,17-19H,7,9H2,1-2H3/b10-6+/t13-,15+/m0/s1 Key: SAHHMCVYMGARBT-GJTNBUKJSA-N; InChI=1/C16H20N2O/c1-10(9-19)6-13-12-4-3-5-14-16(12)11(8-18-14)7-15(13)17-2/h3-6,8,13,15,17-19H,7,9H2,1-2H3/b10-6+/t13-,15+/m0/s1 Key: SAHHMCVYMGARBT-GJTNBUKJBF
- SMILES: C/C(=C\[C@@H]1[C@@H](CC2=CNC3=CC=CC1=C23)NC)/CO

Properties
Chemical formula	C_{16}H_{20}N_{2}O
Molar mass	256.349 g·mol^{−1}
- Except where otherwise noted, data are given for materials in their standard state (at 25 °C [77 °F], 100 kPa). Infobox references

Chanoclavine II is an ergoline compound produced by certain fungi.

== See also ==
- Chanoclavine
