= C16H16N2O2 =

The molecular formula C_{16}H_{16}N_{2}O_{2} (molar mass: 268.31 g/mol) may refer to:

- DMeOB
- Lysergic acid, or D-lysergic acid
- Paspalic acid
- Salen ligand
