= Ergocristine =

Chemical compound

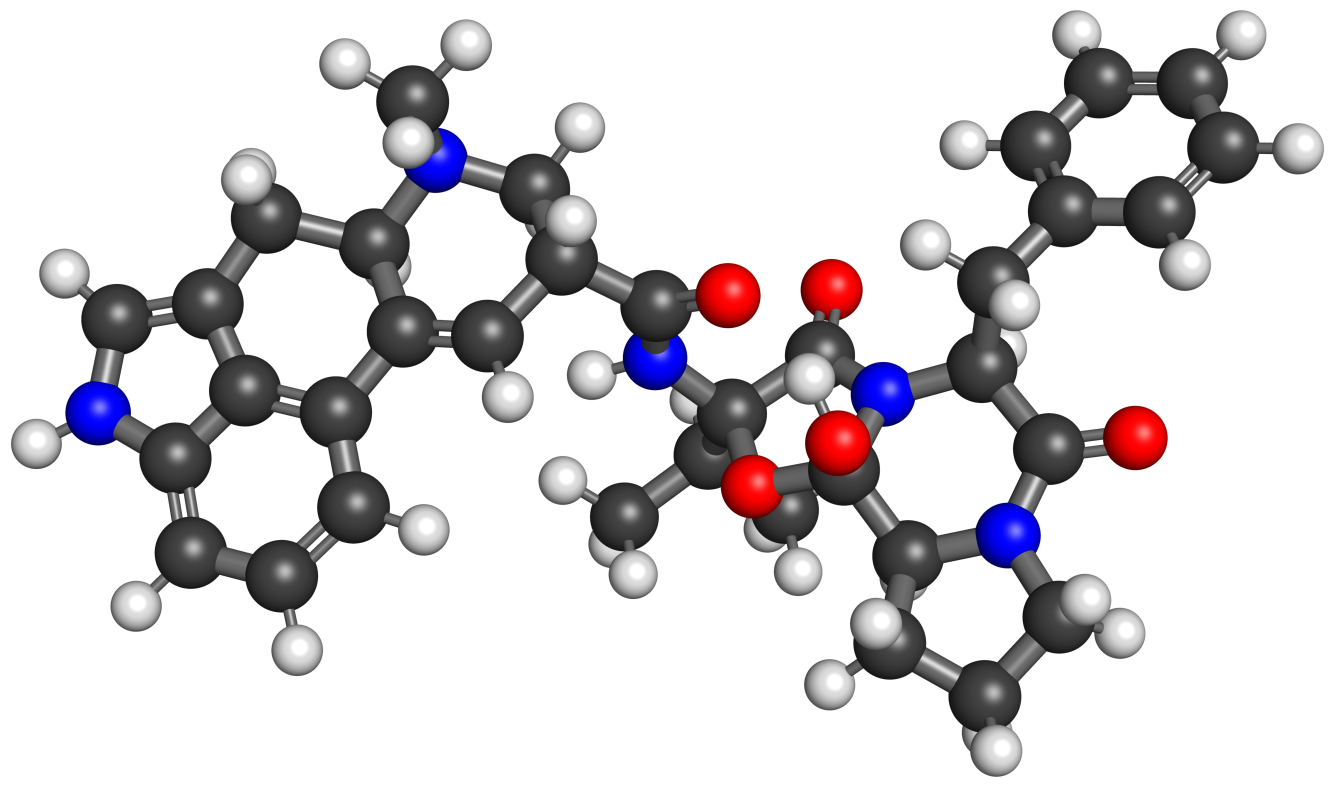

Legal status
- Legal status: US: List I (a precursor)

Identifiers
- CAS Number: 511-08-0
- PubChem CID: 31116
- ChemSpider: 28873
- UNII: 3E58HO2T0U
- ChEMBL: ChEMBL446315
- CompTox Dashboard (EPA): DTXSID40891858
- ECHA InfoCard: 100.007.383

Chemical and physical data
- Formula: C_{35}H_{39}N_{5}O_{5}
- Molar mass: 609.727 g·mol^{−1}
- 3D model (JSmol): Interactive image
- SMILES: O=C3N1CCC[C@H]1[C@]2(O)O[C@](C(=O)N2[C@H]3Cc4ccccc4)(NC(=O)[C@@H]8/C=C7/c5cccc6c5c(c[nH]6)C[C@H]7N(C)C8)C(C)C
- InChI: InChI=1S/C35H39N5O5/c1-20(2)34(37-31(41)23-16-25-24-11-7-12-26-30(24)22(18-36-26)17-27(25)38(3)19-23)33(43)40-28(15-21-9-5-4-6-10-21)32(42)39-14-8-13-29(39)35(40,44)45-34/h4-7,9-12,16,18,20,23,27-29,36,44H,8,13-15,17,19H2,1-3H3,(H,37,41)/t23-,27-,28+,29+,34-,35+/m1/s1; Key:HEFIYUQVAZFDEE-MKTPKCENSA-N

Ergocristine is an ergopeptine and one of the ergot alkaloids. As of February 24, 2010 ergocristine has been federally regulated. Because of the existing Controlled Substances Act regulatory controls on the LSD precursors lysergic acid, lysergic acid amide, ergotamine, and ergonovine, clandestine laboratory operators have sought uncontrolled sources of precursor material for the production of LSD. This has led to the illicit utilization of the precursor chemical ergocristine as a direct substitute for ergotamine and ergonovine for the illicit production of LSD. In fact, the largest clandestine LSD laboratory ever, William Leonard Pickard and Clyde Apperson, that was seized by the Drug Enforcement Administration (DEA) utilized ergocristine as the LSD precursor according to court documents.

The DEA determined that ergocristine was readily available from commercial chemical suppliers. DEA had identified at least three suppliers of ergocristine, of which one distributor is located domestically; the other two are based in Germany and the Czech Republic.
