= Ergovaline =

Chemical compound

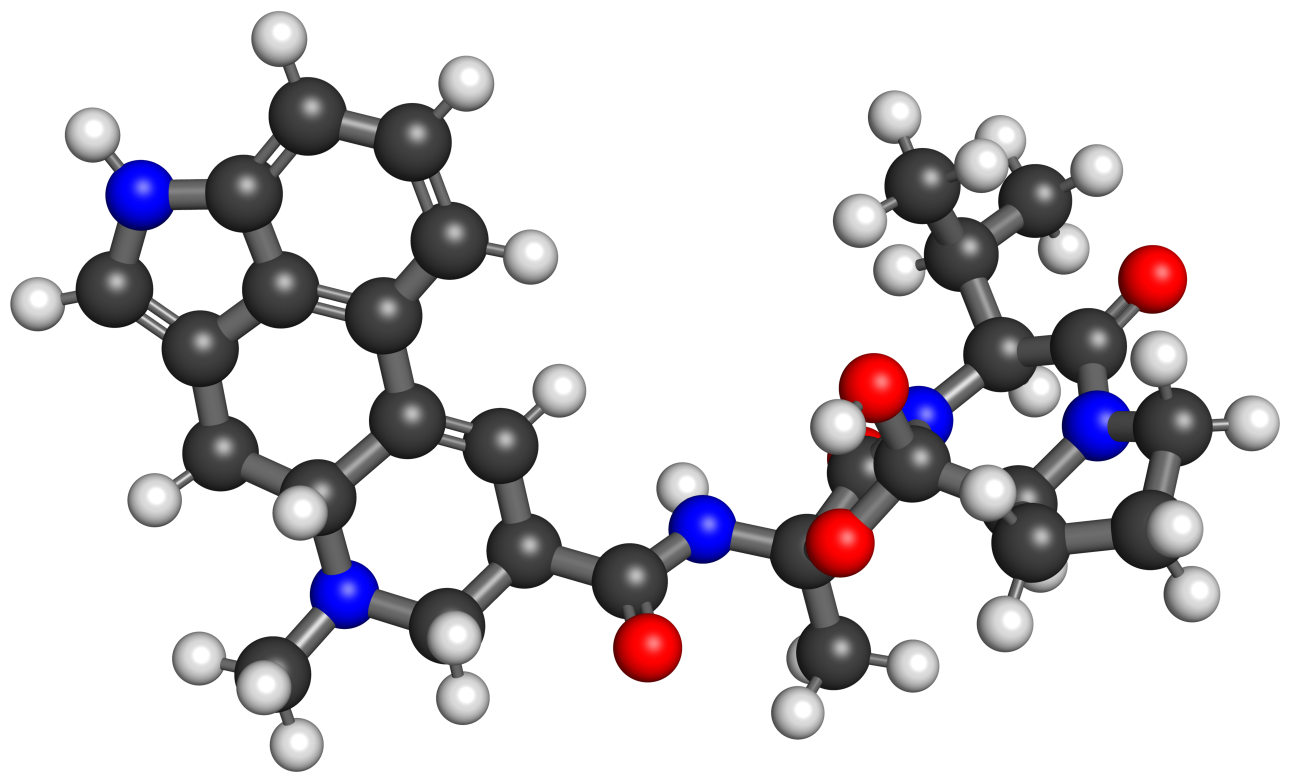

Identifiers
- CAS Number: 2873-38-3
- PubChem CID: 104843
- ChemSpider: 94635
- UNII: 059E2O9IV4
- CompTox Dashboard (EPA): DTXSID10893243

Chemical and physical data
- Formula: C_{29}H_{35}N_{5}O_{5}
- Molar mass: 533.629 g·mol^{−1}
- 3D model (JSmol): Interactive image
- SMILES: O=C3N1CCC[C@H]1[C@]2(O)O[C@](C(=O)N2[C@H]3C(C)C)(NC(=O)[C@@H]7/C=C6/c4cccc5c4c(c[nH]5)C[C@H]6N(C)C7)C
- InChI: InChI=1S/C29H35N5O5/c1-15(2)24-26(36)33-10-6-9-22(33)29(38)34(24)27(37)28(3,39-29)31-25(35)17-11-19-18-7-5-8-20-23(18)16(13-30-20)12-21(19)32(4)14-17/h5,7-8,11,13,15,17,21-22,24,30,38H,6,9-10,12,14H2,1-4H3,(H,31,35)/t17-,21-,22+,24+,28-,29+/m1/s1; Key:BGHDUTQZGWOQIA-VQSKNWBGSA-N

Ergovaline is an ergopeptine and one of the ergot alkaloids. It is usually found in endophyte-infected species of grass like Tall fescue or Perennial Ryegrass. It is toxic to cattle feeding on infected grass, probably because it acts as a vasoconstrictor.

== See also ==
- Neotyphodium coenophialum
