= C32H41N5O5 =

The molecular formula C_{32}H_{41}N_{5}O_{5} (molar mass: 575.710 g/mol) may refer to:

- Ergocryptine
- beta-Ergocryptine
