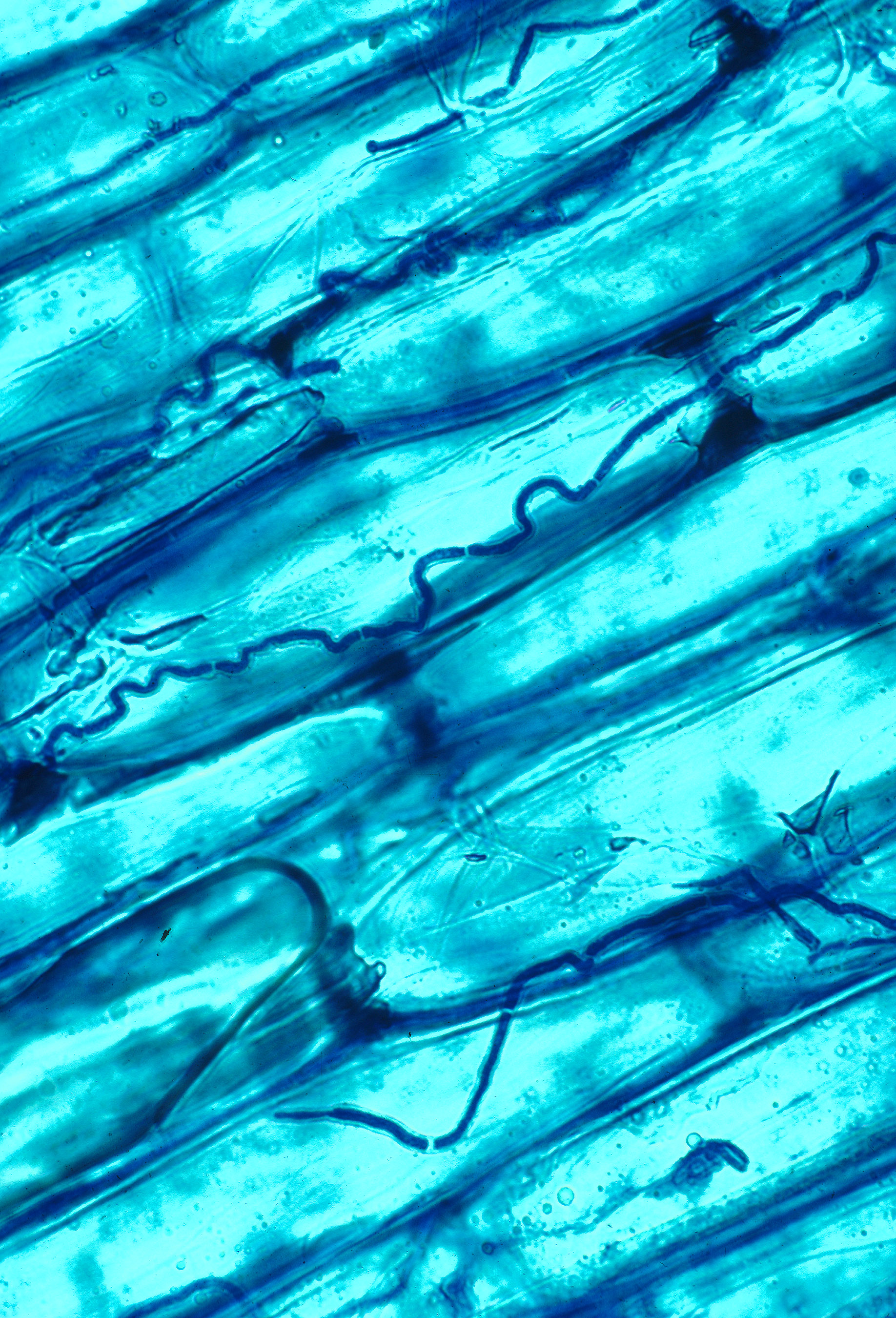

Scientific classification
- Kingdom: Fungi
- Division: Ascomycota
- Class: Sordariomycetes
- Order: Hypocreales
- Family: Clavicipitaceae
- Genus: Epichloë
- Species: E. coenophiala

Binomial name
- Epichloë coenophiala (Morgan-Jones & W.Gams) C.W. Bacon & Schardl

Synonyms
- Acremonium coenophialum Morgan-Jones & W.Gams; Neotyphodium coenophialum (Morgan-Jones & W.Gams) Glenn, C.W.Bacon & Hanlin

= Epichloë coenophiala =

Species of fungus

Epichloë coenophiala is a systemic and seed-transmissible endophyte of tall fescue, a grass endemic to Eurasia and North Africa, but widely naturalized in North America, Australia and New Zealand. The endophyte has been identified as the cause of the "fescue toxicosis" syndrome sometimes suffered by livestock that graze the infected grass. Possible symptoms include poor weight gain, elevated body temperature, reduced conception rates, agalactia, rough hair coat, fat necrosis, loss of switch and ear tips, and lameness or dry gangrene of the feet. Because of the resemblance to symptoms of ergotism in humans, the most likely agents responsible for fescue toxicosis are thought to be the ergot alkaloids, principally ergovaline produced by E. coenophiala.

Continued popularity of tall fescue with this endophyte, despite episodic livestock toxicosis, is attributable to the exceptional productivity and stress tolerance of the grass in pastures and hay fields. The endophyte produces two classes of alkaloids, loline alkaloids and the pyrrolopyrazine, peramine, which are insecticidal and insect deterrent, respectively, and presence of the fungus increases drought tolerance, nitrogen utilization, phosphate acquisition, and resistance to nematodes. Recently, natural strains of E. coenophiala with little or no ergot alkaloid production have been introduced into tall fescue for new cultivar development. These strains are apparently not toxic to livestock, and also provide some, but not necessarily all, of the benefits attributable to the "common toxic" strains in the older tall fescue cultivars.

Epichloë coniophiala was originally described as an Acremonium species and later moved to the anamorphic form genus Neotyphodium. Today, it is classified in Epichloë. Molecular phylogenetic analysis indicates that E. coenophiala is an interspecific hybrid with three ancestors: E. festucae, a strain from the Epichloë typhina complex (from Poa nemoralis) and a third, undescribed or extinct species similar to the Lolium associated clade of Epichloë baconii that also contributed a genome to the hybrid endophyte E. occultans, among others.
