= Loline alkaloid =

Class of chemical compounds

Figure 1. General structure of the loline alkaloids produced in grasses infected by fungi of the Epichloë/Neotyphodium complex (epichloae endophytes); R' and R'' denote variable substituents that can include methyl, formyl, and acetyl groups giving rise to different loline species.

A loline alkaloid is a member of the 1-aminopyrrolizidines (often referred to as lolines), which are bioactive natural products with several distinct biological and chemical features. The lolines are insecticidal and insect-deterrent compounds that are produced in grasses infected by endophytic fungal symbionts of the genus Epichloë (anamorph species: Neotyphodium). Lolines increase resistance of endophyte-infected grasses to insect herbivores, and may also protect the infected plants from environmental stresses such as drought and spatial competition. They are alkaloids, organic compounds containing basic nitrogen atoms. The basic chemical structure of the lolines comprises a saturated pyrrolizidine ring, a primary amine at the C-1 carbon, and an internal ether bridge—a hallmark feature of the lolines, which is uncommon in organic compounds—joining two distant ring (C-2 and C-7) carbons (see Fig. 1). Different substituents at the C-1 amine, such as methyl, formyl, and acetyl groups, yield loline species that have variable bioactivity against insects. Besides endophyte–grass symbionts, loline alkaloids have also been identified in some other plant species; namely, Adenocarpus species (family Fabaceae) and Argyreia mollis (family Convolvulaceae).

== Discovery ==
A member of the loline alkaloids was first isolated from the grass Lolium temulentum and its elemental composition determined in 1892. It was initially named temuline and later renamed norloline. Studies in the 1950s and 1960s by Russian researchers established the name loline and identified the characteristic 2,7 ether bridge in its molecular structure. Since then the analytical methods for purification and analysis of the lolines have been refined and several different loline species have been identified in many Lolium and related grasses infected by the Epichloë/Neotyphodium (epichloae) endophytes. Lolines are absent in grass plants that do not harbor the epichloae endophytes, and not all epichloae produce the lolines. Because of the very intimate association of plant and endophyte and difficulties to reproduce the symbiotic conditions in vitro, it was long unknown if the fungus was the producer of the lolines, or if they were synthesized by the plant in response to endophyte infection. In 2001, it was demonstrated that the endophyte Neotyphodium uncinatum produces lolines in some chemically defined growth media, which suggests that the endophyte is also the producer of the lolines in the grass plant. The lolines have also been reported from some plants in several plant families, suggesting a more widespread occurrence of these compounds in nature.

== Mechanism of action ==
Lolines are insecticidal and deterrent to a broad range of insects, including species in the Hemiptera, Coleoptera, Hymenoptera, Lepidoptera, and Blattodea, such as the bird cherry-oat aphid (genus Rhopalosiphum), large milkweed bug (Oncopeltus fasciatus), and American cockroach (Periplaneta americana). LC_{50} values of N-formylloline or N-acetylloline from grass seed extracts are 1-20 μg/ml for aphids and milkweed bugs and impair insect development and fecundity and cause avoidance of loline-containing grass tissues. However, results of feeding tests with grass extracts are occasionally difficult to interpret due to the presence of other endophyte alkaloids in these extracts, and the exact mechanisms of the insecticidal actions of the lolines are unknown. The lolines may be neurotoxic to the insects, and differences in the chemical groups at the C-1-amine result in different levels of insect toxicity; for example, N-formylloline (see Fig. 2), which occurs in higher concentrations in endophyte-infected grass plants, has greater insect toxicity than some other lolines, which occur at lower concentrations in the grass plant.

Figure 2. N-formylloline, one of the most abundant lolines in endophyte-infected grasses.

Loline bioactivities show some unexpected variability with variation in their concentration in grass tissues. For example, the tall fescue endophyte, N. coenophialum, has been associated with enhanced resistance to the migratory root-endoparasitic nematode, Pratylenchus scribneri. At low concentrations, N-formylloline serves as a chemoattractant for P. scribneri, but acts as a repellant at higher concentrations. However, ergot alkaloids also have repellent and immobilizing effects on P. scribneri, and an endophyte of perennial ryegrass lacking lolines, and genetically engineered to produce no ergot alkaloids, exhibits resistance to this nematode. Therefore, the relative importance of the loline and ergot alkaloids to nematode resistance remains unclear.

Many epichloae endophytes—including N. coenophialum symbiotic with Lolium arundinaceum (syn. Festuca arundinacea, tall fescue)—also produce ergot alkaloids that are toxic to mammalian herbivores. The ergot alkaloids occur at relatively low concentrations in the plant and are often difficult to detect analytically. By contrast, the lolines frequently accumulate to very high levels in grass tissues, and were, therefore, initially associated also with toxicity to mammalian herbivores. Specifically, the lolines were thought to be responsible for toxic symptoms called fescue toxicosis displayed by livestock grazing on grasses infected by N. coenophialum. However, subsequently it was demonstrated that only the endophyte-produced ergot alkaloids are responsible for the symptoms of fescue toxicosis (or summer syndrome), and not the lolines which, even at high doses, have only very small physiological effects on mammalians feeders. Another group of alkaloids, the senecio-type alkaloids, are produced by various plants and like the lolines, the senecio alkaloids possess a pyrrolizidine ring structure. Unlike the lolines, however, the senecio alkaloids exhibit strong hepatotoxicity, owing to a double bond between C-1 and C-2 in their ring structure. This double bond is absent in the lolines, explaining the lack of hepatotoxicity of this group of compounds. The lolines have been suggested to inhibit seed germination or growth of other plants (allelopathy), and to increase resistance of infected grasses against drought, but such effects have not been substantiated under more natural conditions of cultivation or in habitats.

== Production and distribution in the grass plant ==
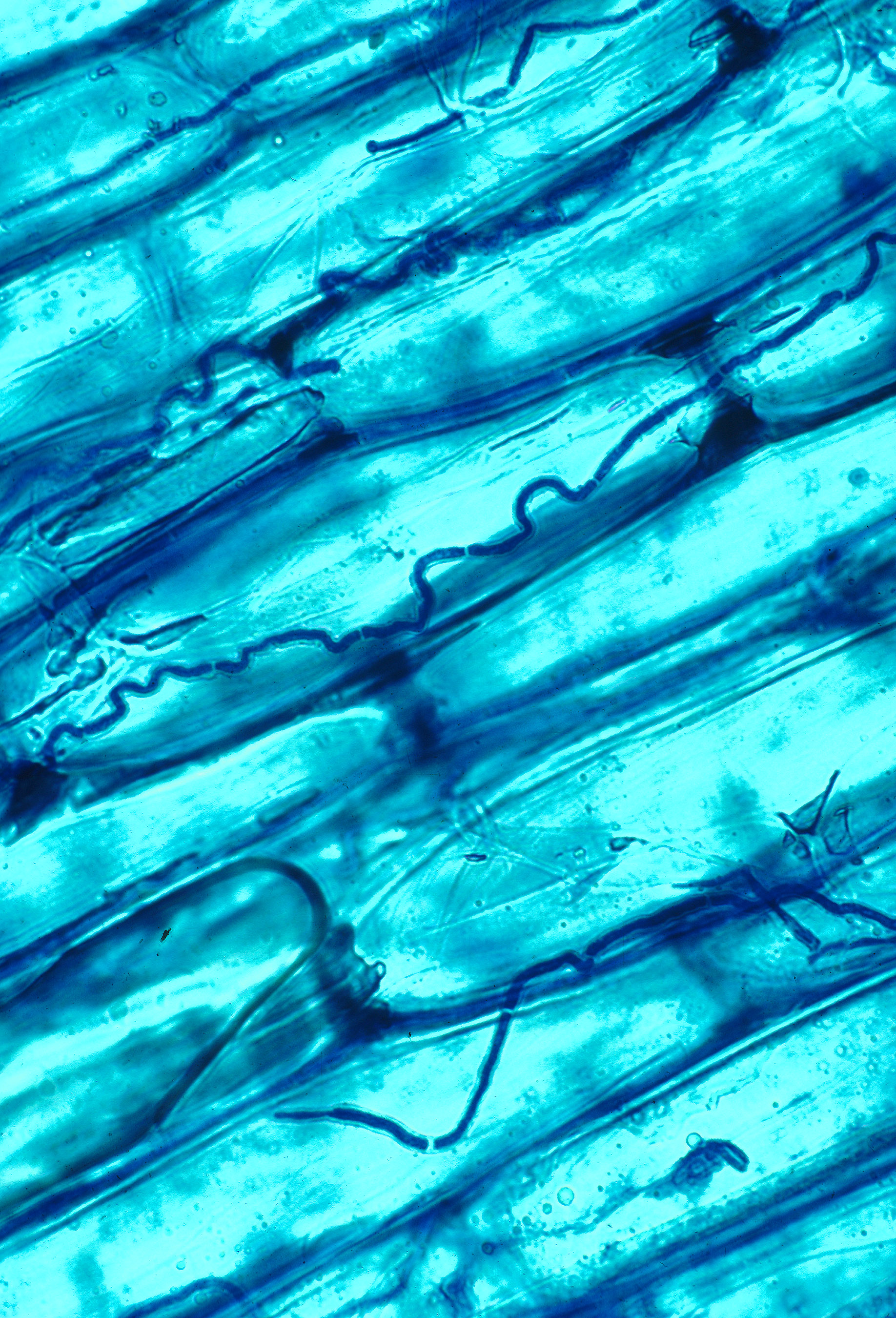
Figure 3. Neotyphodium coenophialum hyphae in tall fescue leaf tissue. Lolines commonly accumulate in the N. coenophialum–tall fescue symbiosis, providing protection from insects and other environmental stresses.

Lolines are produced by several grass–endophyte symbioses involving epichloae species, often along with other bioactive metabolites including ergot alkaloids and indole diterpenoids, and the unusual pyrrolopyrazine alkaloid, peramine, which is not found in other biological communities or organisms. The lolines are produced at levels, however, that can exceed 10 mg/g grass tissue (ranging from 2–20,000 μg/g), exceeding the concentrations of the other endophyte alkaloids by >1000-fold. Lolines produced in the grasses Lolium pratense (syn. Festuca pratensis, meadow fescue) and tall fescue infected by N. uncinatum and N. coenophialum (see Fig. 3), respectively, exhibit variable concentrations in grass tissues. Higher loline concentrations (100–1000 μg/g) are present in the seeds and in younger leaf tissues, and the lolines display seasonal changes in concentration levels throughout the plant. The periodical appearance of tissues with high loline concentrations, such as flowering stems and seeds, contributes to this seasonal variation. Loline concentrations often increase in grass tissues regrown after defoliation and clipping of plants, suggesting an inducible defense response mechanism, involving both symbiotic partners. However, this increase appears to be due to higher loline levels in younger leaves compared to older leaves, but loline increases resembling inducible plant defenses have also been reported. Variation of loline concentration with the developmental stage of specific grass tissues suggests regulation of in planta loline distributions, providing greater protection of newly grown or embryonic tissues against attacks by insects. Surprisingly, exogenous application of the plant signaling compound, methyl jasmonate—which commonly signals predation by insects—decreases expression of the genes for the lolines. The factors that control loline production vary also among endophyte-infected grass tissues: whereas plant-supplied amino acids that are loline precursors limit accumulation of lolines in many grass tissues, their production in tissues that bear external mycelial growth for fungal reproduction (stromata) is regulated by the expression of loline genes.

== Biosynthesis ==
The lolines are structurally similar to pyrrolizidine alkaloids produced by many plants, notably the necine ring containing a tertiary amine. This led to the early hypothesis that the biosynthesis of the lolines is similar to that of the plant pyrrolizidines, which are synthesized from polyamines. However, feeding studies with carbon isotope–labeled amino acids or related molecules in pure cultures of the loline-producing fungus N. uncinatum recently demonstrated that the loline alkaloid pathway is fundamentally different from that of the plant pyrrolizidines. The basic loline chemical structure is assembled in several biosynthetic steps from the amino acid precursors, L-proline and L-homoserine. In the proposed first step in loline biosynthesis, these two amino acids are coupled in a condensation reaction linking the γ-carbon in homoserine to the secondary amine in proline in a PLP–type enzyme–catalyzed reaction to form the loline intermediate, N-(3-amino-3-carboxy)propylproline (NACPP). Further steps in loline biosynthesis are thought to proceed with sequential PLP-enzyme-catalyzed and oxidative decarboxylations of the carboxy groups in the homoserine and proline moieties, respectively, cyclization to form the core loline ring structure, and oxidation of the C-2 and C-7 carbons to give the oxygen bridge spanning the two pyrrolizidine rings.

Genetic studies agree with the biosynthetic routes established in the precursor-feeding experiments. AFLP-based studies using crosses between strains of the endophyte, Epichloë festucae, that differ in the capacity to produce lolines, show that loline production and protection of the grass, Lolium giganteum, from feeding by the aphid, Rhopalosiphum padi, segregate in a Mendelian fashion. The presence of a single locus for loline production was later confirmed by the finding that loline-producing epichloae endophytes contain a gene cluster (LOL cluster) of at least eleven genes. The LOL genes are greatly and coordinately upregulated during loline alkaloid production, and experimental genetic tests involving manipulation of selected LOL genes by RNA interference and gene knockout have directly confirmed the involvement of two of the LOL genes in loline biosynthesis. These tests and similarities in the peptide sequences of the proteins encoded by these genes to known enzymes indicate that one gene, termed lolC, is likely required for the first step in loline biosynthesis (condensation of L-proline and L-homoserine for NACPP formation), and another gene, LolP —likely encoding a cytochrome P450 monooxygenase—, for oxygenation of one methyl group on the C-1 amine of N-methylloline, which gives the most abundant loline in many grass–endophyte symbionts, N-formylloline.
