= Lysergic acid methyl ester =

Names
- IUPAC name Methyl 6-methyl-9,10-didehydroergoline-8β-carboxylate
- Systematic IUPAC name Methyl (6aR,9R)-7-methyl-4,6,6a,7,8,9-hexahydroindolo[4,3-fg]quinoline-9-carboxylic acid
- Other names Methyl lysergate

Identifiers
CAS Number	4579-64-0
3D model (JSmol)	Interactive image
ChemSpider	9589747
ECHA InfoCard	100.022.696
PubChem CID	11414860
UNII	13782F2619
CompTox Dashboard (EPA)	DTXSID80963442
- InChI: InChI=1S/C17H18N2O2/c1-19-9-11(17(20)21-2)6-13-12-4-3-5-14-16(12)10(8-18-14)7-15(13)19/h3-6,8,11,15,18H,7,9H2,1-2H3/t11-,15-/m1/s1 Key: RNHDWLRHUJZABX-IAQYHMDHSA-N; InChI=1/C17H18N2O2/c1-19-9-11(17(20)21-2)6-13-12-4-3-5-14-16(12)10(8-18-14)7-15(13)19/h3-6,8,11,15,18H,7,9H2,1-2H3/t11-,15-/m1/s1 Key: RNHDWLRHUJZABX-IAQYHMDHBA
- SMILES: O=C(OC)[C@@H]3/C=C2/c4cccc1c4c(c[nH]1)C[C@H]2N(C3)C

Properties
Chemical formula	C_{17}H_{18}N_{2}O_{2}
Molar mass	282.343 g·mol^{−1}
- Except where otherwise noted, data are given for materials in their standard state (at 25 °C [77 °F], 100 kPa). verify (what is ?) Infobox references

Lysergic acid methyl ester, also known as methyl lysergate, is an analogue of lysergic acid. A 10-step total synthesis of lysergic acid methyl ester from tryptophan has been described. Other syntheses have also been described. It can be used as a commercially available precursor in the synthesis of psychedelic lysergamides like LSD and prodrugs such as 1S-LSD and 1Bz-LSD.

== See also ==
- Substituted lysergamide
- Lysergic acid
- Paspalic acid
