= C17H18N2O2 =

The molecular formula C_{17}H_{18}N_{2}O_{2} (molar mass: 282.337 g/mol) may refer to:

- Lysergic acid methyl ester
- Salpn ligand
