= Bromocriptine =

Dopamine agonist medication

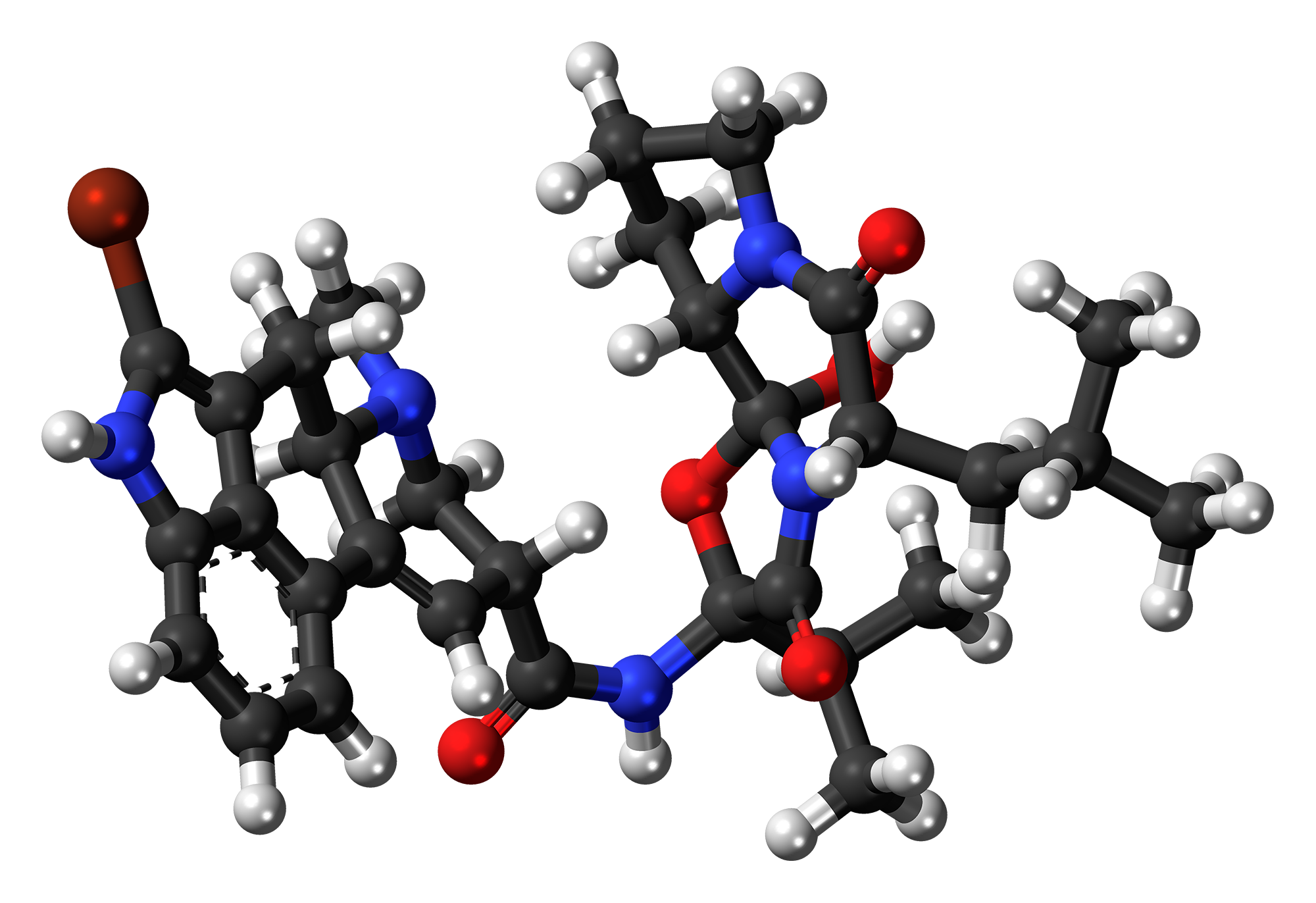

Clinical data
- Trade names: Parlodel, others
- Other names: 2-Bromoergocriptine; Bromoergocryptine; 2-Bromocriptine; CB-154
- AHFS/Drugs.com: Monograph
- MedlinePlus: a682079
- Pregnancy category: AU: A
- Routes of administration: Oral, vaginal, intravenous
- Drug class: Dopamine receptor agonist; Serotonin receptor agonist; Adrenergic receptor modulator; Antiparkinsonian agent; Prolactin inhibitor; Anti-diabetic drug
- ATC code: G02CB01 (WHO) N04BC01 (WHO)

Legal status
- Legal status: AU: S4 (Prescription only); CA: ℞-only; UK: POM (Prescription only); US: ℞-only

Pharmacokinetic data
- Bioavailability: 28% of oral dose absorbed
- Metabolism: Extensively liver-mediated
- Elimination half-life: 12–14 hours
- Excretion: 85% bile (feces), 2.5–5.5% urine

Identifiers
- IUPAC name: (5′α)-2-bromo-12′-hydroxy-5′-(2-methylpropyl)-3′,6′,18-trioxo-2′-(propan-2-yl)ergotaman
- CAS Number: 25614-03-3
- PubChem CID: 31101
- IUPHAR/BPS: 35
- DrugBank: DB01200
- ChemSpider: 28858
- UNII: 3A64E3G5ZO
- KEGG: D03165
- ChEBI: CHEBI:3181
- ChEMBL: ChEMBL493
- CompTox Dashboard (EPA): DTXSID1022687
- ECHA InfoCard: 100.042.829

Chemical and physical data
- Formula: C_{32}H_{40}BrN_{5}O_{5}
- Molar mass: 654.606 g·mol^{−1}
- 3D model (JSmol): Interactive image
- SMILES: BrC1=C(C[C@H]2N(C)C3)C4=C(C=CC=C4C2=C[C@H]3C(N[C@]5(C(C)C)O[C@@]6(N([C@@H](CC(C)C)C(N7CCC[C@H]76)=O)C5=O)O)=O)N1
- InChI: InChI=1S/C32H40BrN5O5/c1-16(2)12-24-29(40)37-11-7-10-25(37)32(42)38(24)30(41)31(43-32,17(3)4)35-28(39)18-13-20-19-8-6-9-22-26(19)21(27(33)34-22)14-23(20)36(5)15-18/h6,8-9,13,16-18,23-25,34,42H,7,10-12,14-15H2,1-5H3,(H,35,39)/t18-,23-,24+,25+,31-,32+/m1/s1; Key:OZVBMTJYIDMWIL-AYFBDAFISA-N

Bromocriptine, sold under the brand name Parlodel among others, is an ergoline derivative and dopamine agonist that is used in the treatment of pituitary tumors, Parkinson's disease, hyperprolactinaemia, neuroleptic malignant syndrome, and, as an adjunct, type 2 diabetes.

It was patented in 1968 and approved for medical use in 1975.

== Medical uses ==
Bromocriptine is used to treat acromegaly and conditions associated with hyperprolactinemia like amenorrhea, infertility, hypogonadism, and prolactin-secreting adenomas. It is also used to prevent ovarian hyperstimulation syndrome and to treat Parkinson's disease.

Since the late 1980s it has been used, off-label, to reduce the symptoms of cocaine withdrawal but the evidence for this use is poor. Bromocriptine has been successfully used in cases of galactorrhea precipitated by dopamine antagonists like risperidone.

A quick-release formulation of bromocriptine, Cycloset, is also used to treat type 2 diabetes. When administered within 2 hours of awakening, it increases hypothalamic dopamine level. That results to a significant weight loss as well as decreases in blood glucose levels, hepatic glucose production, and insulin resistance. It therefore acts as an adjunct to diet and exercise to improve glycemic control and cardiovascular risk.

== Side effects ==
Most frequent side effects are nausea, orthostatic hypotension, headaches, and vomiting through stimulation of the brainstem vomiting centre. Vasospasms with serious consequences such as myocardial infarction and stroke that have been reported in connection with the puerperium, appear to be extremely rare events. Peripheral vasospasm (of the fingers or toes) can cause Raynaud's phenomenon.

Bromocriptine use has been anecdotally associated with causing or worsening psychotic symptoms (its mechanism is in opposition of most antipsychotics, whose mechanisms generally block dopamine receptors). It should be understood, however, that the greater affinity bromocriptine and many similar antiparkinson's drugs have for the D_{2S} receptor form (considered to be mostly present at inhibitory D_{2} autoreceptor locatations) relative to the D_{2L} form, sufficiently low partial agonist activity (i.e. where a molecule binding to a receptor induces limited effects while preventing a stronger ligand like dopamine from binding), and, possibly, the functional selectivity of a particular drug may generate antidopaminergic effects that are more similar than oppositional in nature to antipsychotics.

Pulmonary fibrosis has been reported when bromocriptine was used in high doses for the treatment of Parkinson's disease.

Use to suppress milk production after childbirth was reviewed in 2014 and it was concluded that in this context a causal association with serious cardiovascular, neurological or psychiatric events could not be excluded with an overall incidence estimated to range between 0.005% and 0.04%. Additional safety precautions and stricter prescribing rules were suggested based on the data. It is a bile salt export pump inhibitor.

After long-term use of dopamine agonists, a withdrawal syndrome may occur during dose reduction or discontinuation with the following possible side effects: anxiety, panic attacks, dysphoria, depression, agitation, irritability, suicidal ideation, fatigue, orthostatic hypotension, nausea, vomiting, diaphoresis, generalized pain, and drug cravings. For some individuals, these withdrawal symptoms are short-lived and they make a full recovery, for others a protracted withdrawal syndrome may occur with withdrawal symptoms persisting for months or years.

== Pharmacology ==
=== Pharmacodynamics ===
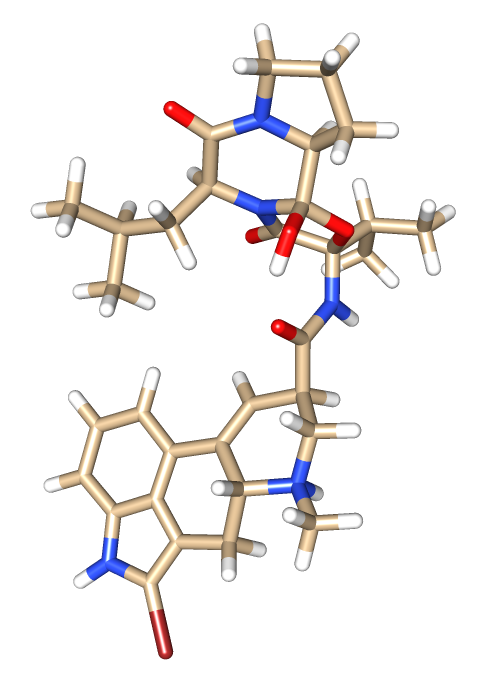
Bromocriptine in a dopamine receptor bound conformation.

Bromocriptine is a partial agonist of the dopamine D_{2} receptor. It also interacts with other dopamine receptors and with various serotonin and adrenergic receptors. Bromocriptine has additionally been found to inhibit the release of glutamate by reversing the glutamate transporter 1 (GLT-1; EAAT2).

Despite acting as a serotonin 5-HT_{2A} receptor agonist, bromocriptine is described as non-hallucinogenic.

As a silent antagonist of the serotonin 5-HT_{2B} receptor, bromocriptine has been said not to pose a risk of cardiac valvulopathy. This is in contrast to other ergolines acting instead as 5-HT_{2B} receptor agonists such as cabergoline and pergolide but is similar to lisuride which likewise acts as a 5-HT_{2B} receptor antagonist. However, in other research, bromocriptine has subsequently been found to be a partial agonist of the serotonin 5-HT_{2B} receptor and has been associated with cardiac valvulopathy and related complications. In any case, bromocriptine seems to have lower risk than certain other drugs.

Activities of bromocriptine at various sites
Site	Affinity (K_{i} [nM])	Efficacy (E_{max} [%])	Action
D_{1}	692	60%	Partial agonist
D_{2S}	5.01	110%	Superagonist
D_{2L}	14.8	84%	Agonist
D_{3}	6.76	87%	Agonist
D_{4}	372	43%	Partial agonist
D_{5}	537	71%	Agonist
5-HT_{1A}	12.9	81%	Agonist
5-HT_{1B}	355	110%	Partial agonist
5-HT_{1D}	10.7	68%	Partial agonist
5-HT_{2A}	107	110%	Full agonist
5-HT_{2B}	56	28%	Partial agonist
5-HT_{2C}	741	61%	Partial agonist
α_{1A}	4.17	100%	Full agonist
α_{1B}	1.38	100%	Full agonist
α_{1D}	1.12	100%	Full agonist
α_{2A}	11.0	–60%	Partial inverse agonist
α_{2B}	34.7	–100%	Full inverse agonist
α_{2C}	28.2	–30%	Partial inverse agonist
Notes: All receptors are human except α_{2D}-adrenergic, which is rat (no human counterpart), and 5-HT_{7}, which is rat/mouse.

== Chemistry ==
Like all ergopeptides, bromocriptine is a cyclol; two peptide groups of its tripeptide moiety are crosslinked, forming the >N-C(OH)< juncture between the two rings with the amide functionality.

Bromocriptine is a semisynthetic derivative of a natural ergot alkaloid, ergocryptine (a derivative of lysergic acid), which is synthesized by bromination of ergocryptine using N-bromosuccinimide.

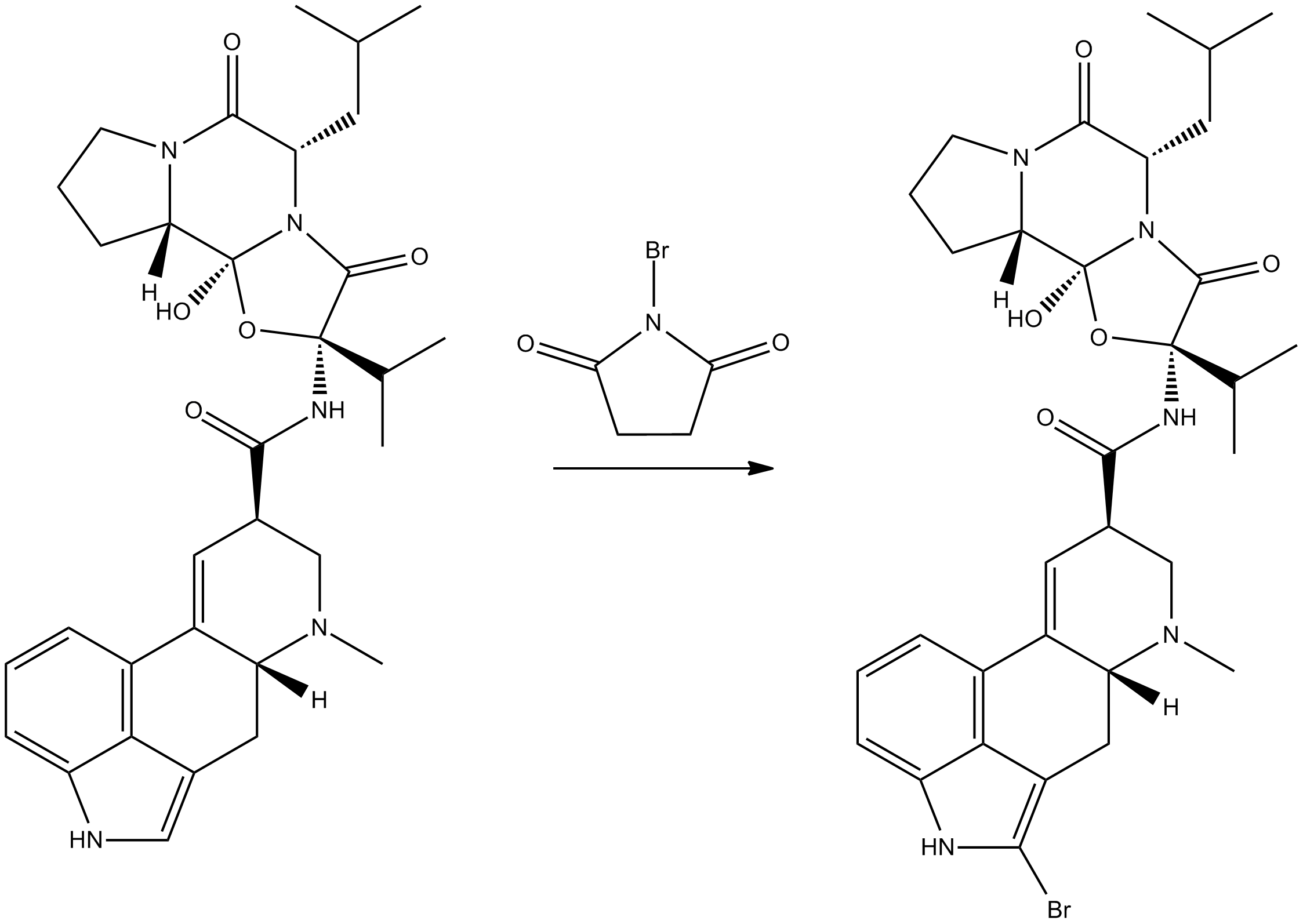

== History ==
Bromocriptine was discovered by scientists at Sandoz in 1965 and was first published in 1968; it was first marketed under the brand name Parlodel.

A quick-release formulation of bromocriptine was approved by the FDA in 2009.

== Society and culture ==
=== Brand names ===
As of July 2017, bromocriptine was sold under many brand names worldwide, including Abergin, Barlolin, Brameston, Brocriptin, Brom, Broma-Del, Bromergocryptine, Bromergon, Bromicon, Bromocorn, Bromocriptin, Bromocriptina, Bromocriptine, Bromocriptine mesilate, Bromocriptine mesylate, Bromocriptine methanesulfonate, Bromocriptini mesilas, Bromocriptinmesilat, Bromodel, Bromokriptin, Bromolac, Bromotine, Bromtine, Brotin, Butin, Corpadel, Cripsa, Criptine, Criten, Cycloset, Degala, Demil, Deparo, Deprolac, Diacriptin, Dopagon, Erenant, Grifocriptina, Gynodel, kirim, Kriptonal, Lactodel, Medocriptine, Melen, Padoparine, Palolactin, Parlodel, Pravidel, Proctinal, Ronalin, Semi-Brom, Serocriptin, Serocryptin, Suplac, Syntocriptine, Umprel, Unew, Updopa, Upnol B, and Volbro.

As of July 2017 it was also sold as a combination drug with metformin as Diacriptin-M, and as a veterinary drug under the brand Pseudogravin.

== See also ==
- Substituted ergoline
