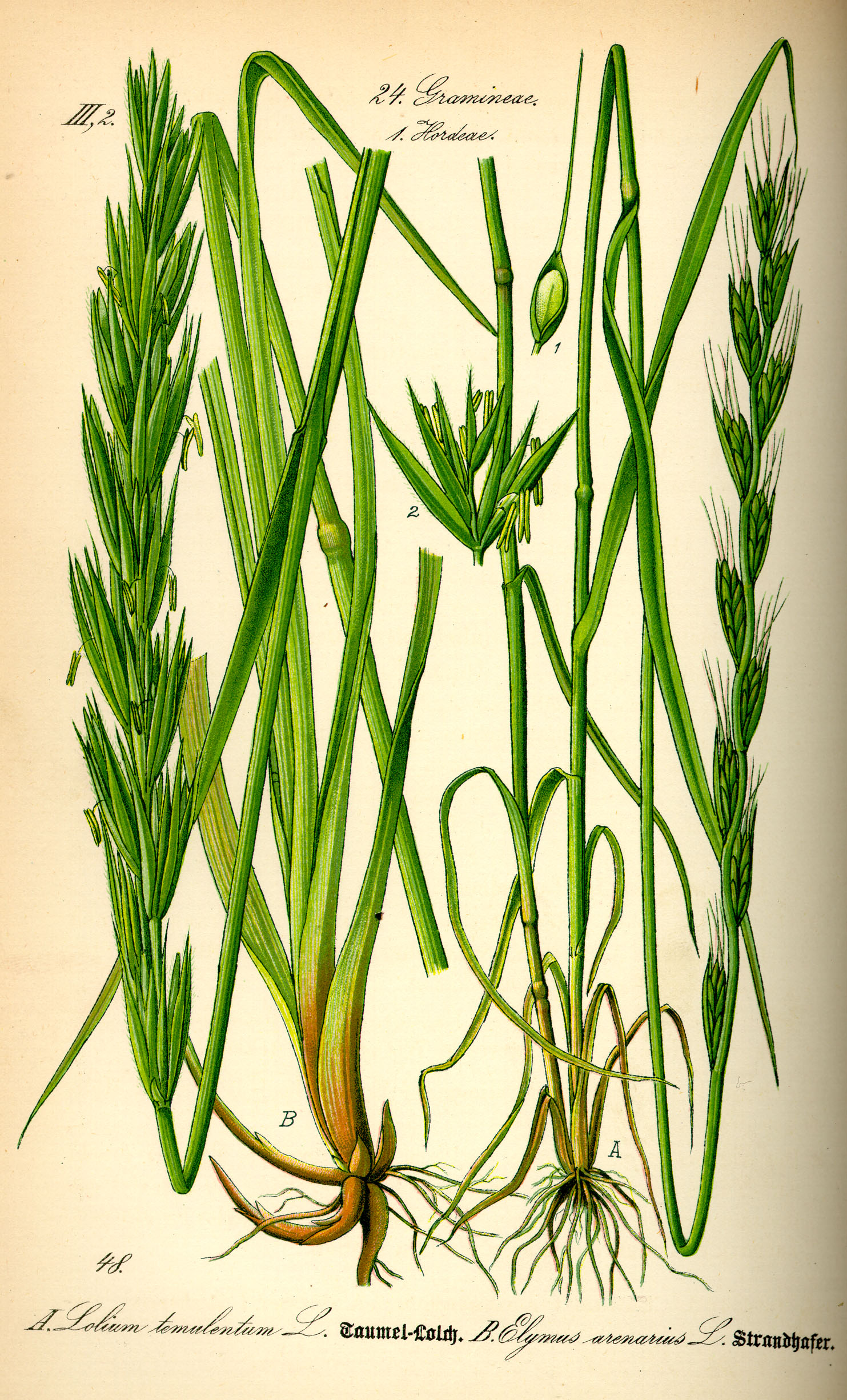

Scientific classification
- Kingdom: Plantae
- Clade: Tracheophytes
- Clade: Angiosperms
- Clade: Monocots
- Clade: Commelinids
- Order: Poales
- Family: Poaceae
- Subfamily: Pooideae
- Genus: Lolium
- Species: L. temulentum

Binomial name
- Lolium temulentum L.

= Lolium temulentum =

Species of plant

Lolium temulentum, commonly known as darnel, poison darnel, darnel ryegrass or cockle, is an annual flowering plant in the grass family Poaceae. The plant stem can grow up to one meter tall, with inflorescence in the ears and purple grain. It has a cosmopolitan distribution.

== Growth ==
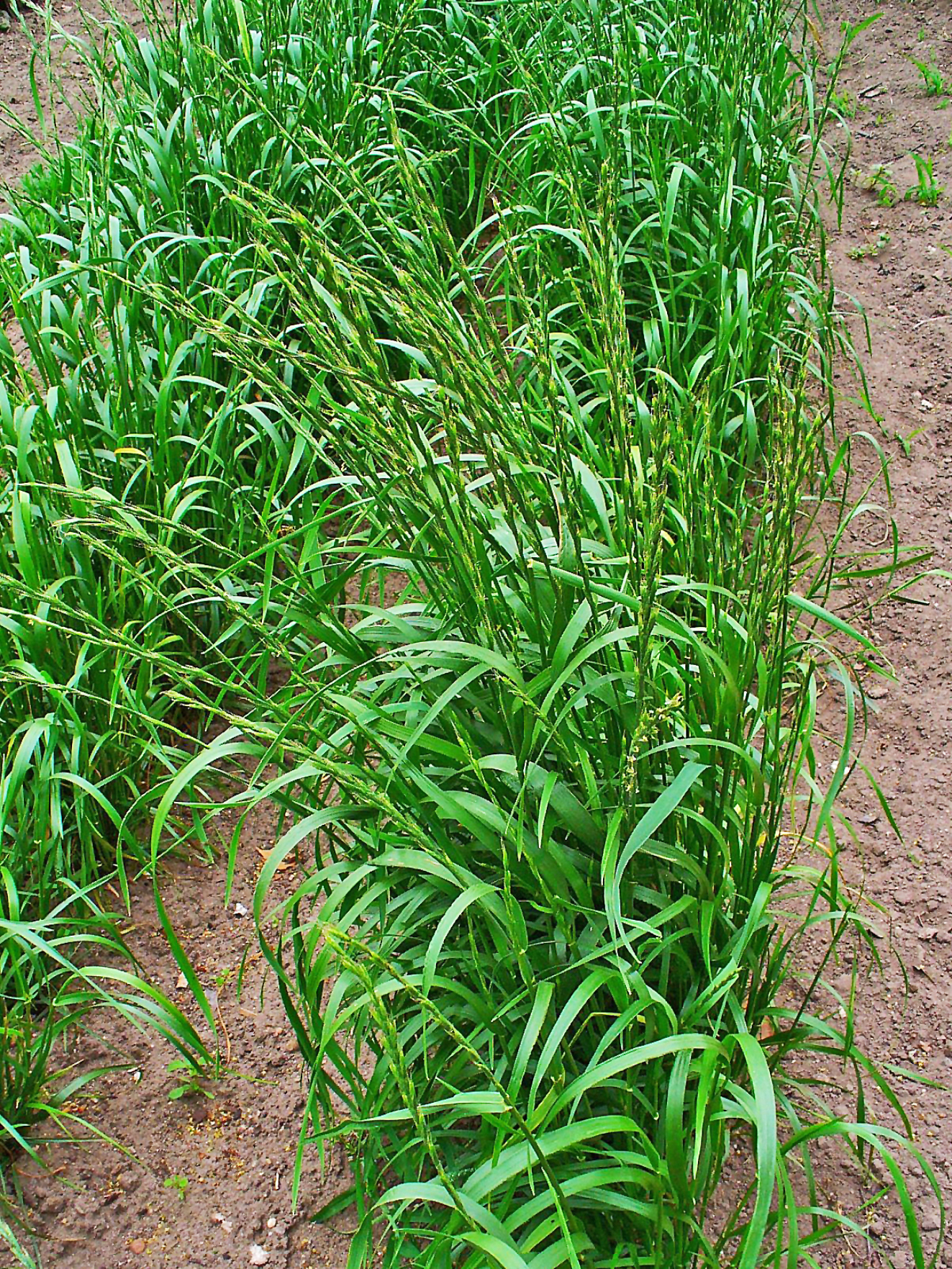
Habitus

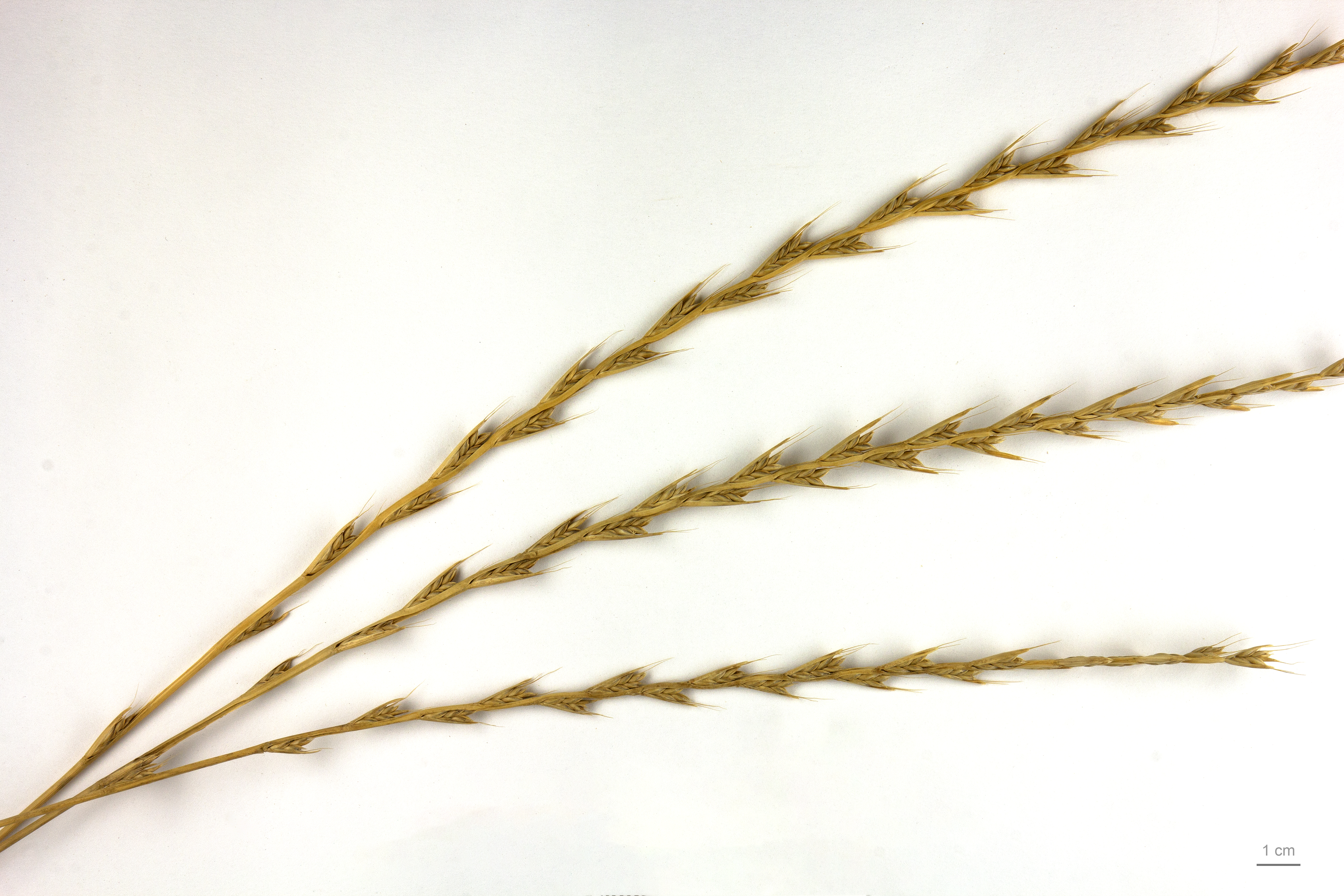
Lolium temulentum (MHNT)

Darnel usually grows in the same production zones as wheat and was a serious weed of cultivation, a Vavilovian mimic of wheat, until modern sorting machinery enabled darnel seeds to be separated efficiently from seed wheat. The similarity between these two plants is so great that in some regions, darnel is called "false wheat." It bears a close resemblance to wheat until the ear appears. The spikes of L. temulentum are more slender than those of wheat. The spikelets are oriented edgeways to the rachis and have only a single glume, while those of wheat are oriented with the flat side to the rachis and have two glumes. Wheat will appear brown when ripe, whereas darnel is black.

Darnel can be infected by an endophytic fungus of the genus Neotyphodium and the endophyte-produced, insecticidal loline alkaloids were first isolated from this plant.

The French word for darnel is ivraie (from Latin ebriacus, intoxicated), which expresses the drunken nausea from eating the infected plant, which can be fatal. The French name echoes the scientific name, Latin temulentus "drunk."

== Literary references ==
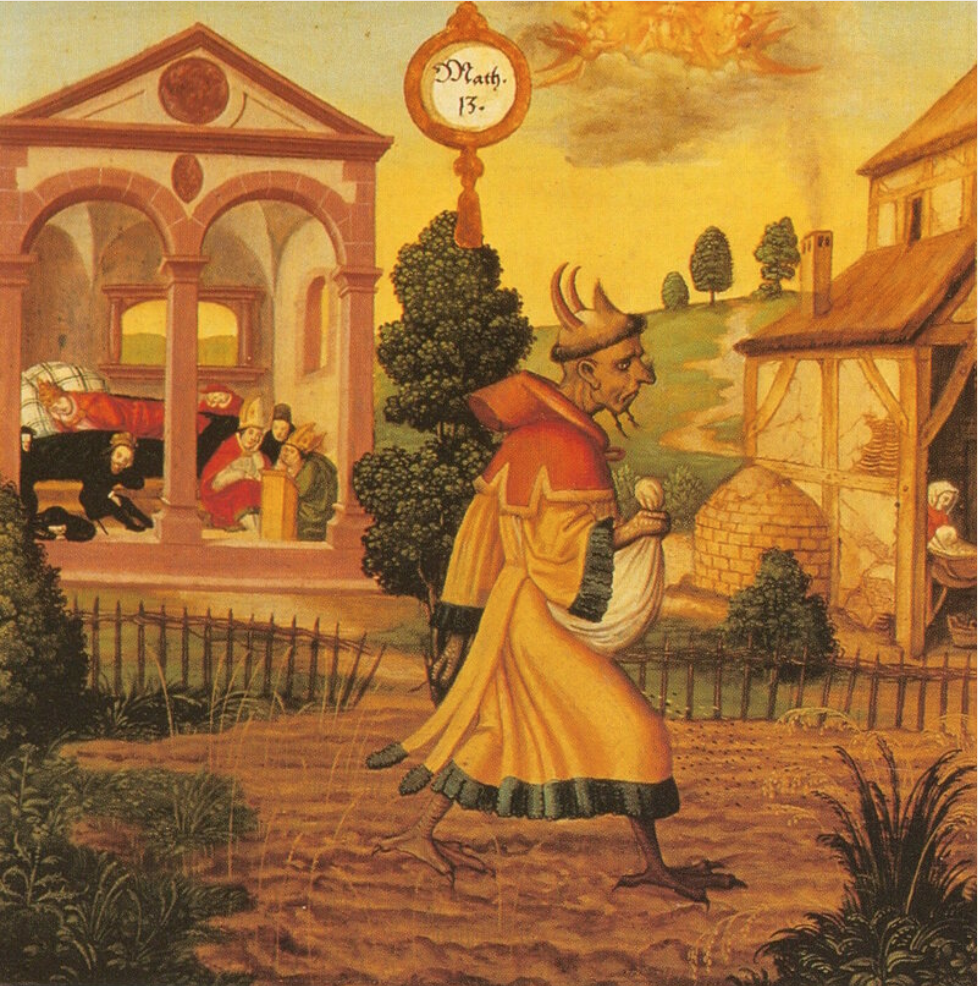
"The enemy sowing darnel seeds" by Heinrich Füllmaurer (1526–1546)

- Aristotle mentions darnel in his On Sleep amongst a short list of substances which induce sleep.
- The ancient Greek botanist Theophrastus stated in his De causis plantarum (8:7 §1) that wheat can transform (metaballein) into darnel (aira), since fields sown to wheat are often darnel when reaped.
- Darnel is one of the many ingredients in mithridate, which Mithridates, the king of ancient Pontus, is supposed to have used every day to render him immune to poisoning.
- Darnel was evidently the toxic weed in the Parable of the Tares in the Gospel of Matthew in the King James Version of the Bible, which translated the Aramaic word zizania as tares:

Let both grow together until the harvest: and in the time of harvest I will say to the reapers, Gather ye together first the tares, and bind them in bundles to burn them: but gather the wheat into my barn.

— Matthew 13:30

- Dionysios, a second-century bishop of Corinth, uses darnel (zizania) as a metaphor for the corruptions of his letters caused by "the devil's apostles."
- Darnel is mentioned in the Mishnah in Kilayim (1:1) as זונין (zunin), similar to the Arabic زؤان (zuʾān).
- The anonymous classic Greek work Geoponika contains multiple references to darnel (zizonia).
- In ordering the St. Brice's Day massacre of all the Danes in England, Æthelred the Unready observed that "all the Danes who had sprung up in this island, sprouting like cockle amongst the wheat, were to be destroyed by a most just extermination."
- Darnel is also mentioned as a weed in Shakespeare's King Lear.
- The 1912 Beatrix Potter book The Tale of Mr. Tod describes a character digging a deep hole for "dog darnel".

== See also ==
- Bromus tectorum
