= Ergocryptine =

Chemical compound

α-Ergocryptine

Identifiers
- CAS Number: 511-09-1
- PubChem CID: 134551
- IUPHAR/BPS: 271
- ChemSpider: 118591
- UNII: 6WFB60157B
- ChEMBL: ChEMBL1403281
- CompTox Dashboard (EPA): DTXSID70893244
- ECHA InfoCard: 100.007.384

Chemical and physical data
- Formula: C_{32}H_{41}N_{5}O_{5}
- Molar mass: 575.710 g·mol^{−1}
- 3D model (JSmol): Interactive image
- SMILES: O=C3N1CCC[C@H]1[C@]2(O)O[C@](C(=O)N2[C@H]3CC(C)C)(NC(=O)[C@@H]7/C=C6/c4cccc5c4c(c[nH]5)C[C@H]6N(C)C7)C(C)C
- InChI: InChI=1S/C32H41N5O5/c1-17(2)12-25-29(39)36-11-7-10-26(36)32(41)37(25)30(40)31(42-32,18(3)4)34-28(38)20-13-22-21-8-6-9-23-27(21)19(15-33-23)14-24(22)35(5)16-20/h6,8-9,13,15,17-18,20,24-26,33,41H,7,10-12,14,16H2,1-5H3,(H,34,38)/t20-,24-,25+,26+,31-,32+/m1/s1; Key:YDOTUXAWKBPQJW-NSLWYYNWSA-N

β-Ergocryptine

Names
- Other names (5'αS)-sec-Butyl-12'-hydroxy-2'-isopropylergotaman-3',6',18-trione

Identifiers
CAS Number	20315-46-2
3D model (JSmol)	Interactive image
ChemSpider	141699
ECHA InfoCard	100.007.384
EC Number	243-728-6
IUPHAR/BPS	988
PubChem CID	161309
UNII	6ZAY944SI4
CompTox Dashboard (EPA)	DTXSID70893244
- InChI: InChI=1S/C32H41N5O5/c1-6-18(4)27-29(39)36-12-8-11-25(36)32(41)37(27)30(40)31(42-32,17(2)3)34-28(38)20-13-22-21-9-7-10-23-26(21)19(15-33-23)14-24(22)35(5)16-20/h7,9-10,13,15,17-18,20,24-25,27,33,41H,6,8,11-12,14,16H2,1-5H3,(H,34,38)/t18-,20+,24+,25-,27+,31+,32-/m0/s1 Key: YYWXOXLDOMRDHW-SGVWFJRMSA-N
- SMILES: CC[C@H](C)[C@@H]1C(=O)N2CCC[C@H]2[C@]3(N1C(=O)[C@](O3)(C(C)C)NC(=O)[C@H]4CN([C@@H]5CC6=CNC7=CC=CC(=C67)C5=C4)C)O

Properties
Chemical formula	C_{32}H_{41}N_{5}O_{5}
Molar mass	575.710 g·mol^{−1}
- Except where otherwise noted, data are given for materials in their standard state (at 25 °C [77 °F], 100 kPa). Infobox references

Ergocryptine is an ergopeptine and one of the ergoline alkaloids. It is isolated from ergot or fermentation broth and it serves as starting material for the production of bromocriptine. Two isomers of ergocryptine exist, α-ergocryptine and β-ergocryptine. The beta differs from the alpha form only in the position of a single methyl group, which is a consequence of the biosynthesis in which the proteinogenic amino acid leucine is replaced by isoleucine. β-Ergocryptine was first identified in 1967 by Albert Hofmann. Ergot from different sources have different ratios of the two isomers.

== Biosynthesis ==
The biosynthetic pathways to ergocryptine starts with the prenylation of L-tryptophan in an SN1 fashion with dimethylallyl pyrophosphate (DMAPP). DMAPP is derived from mevalonic acid. This reaction is catalyzed by a prenyltransferase enzyme (Prenyltransferase 4-dimethylallyltryptophan synthase) named FgaPT2 in Aspergillus fumigatus. An X-ray structure of the prenyltransferase FgaPT2 and tryptophan has been reported, and used to propose a three step mechanism: (1) formation of allylic carbocation; (2) nucleophile attack of tryptophan on the carbocation; (3) deprotonation to restore aromaticity and generate the product, 4-dimethylallyltryptophan (DMAT). DMAT is then N-methylated at the amino of the tryptophan backbone with the EasF enzyme, named FgaMT in A. fumigatus. S-adenosylmethionine (SAM) being the methyl source.

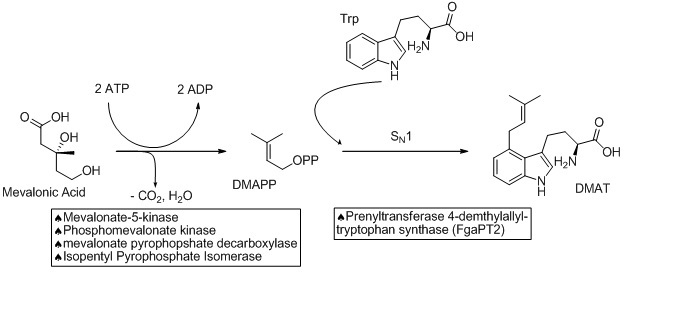

The next step in the biosynthesis of ergocryptine is the transformation of 4-dimethylallyl abrine to Chanoclavine-I. It has been shown that the [enzyme EasE and EasC (FgaOx1 and FgaCat in A. fumigatus, respectively) are both required to generate Chanoclavine-I from 4-DMA abrine. Mutation experiments altering these enzymes independently stopped the pathway at abrine. This indicates that cooperation between EasE and EasC is necessary.

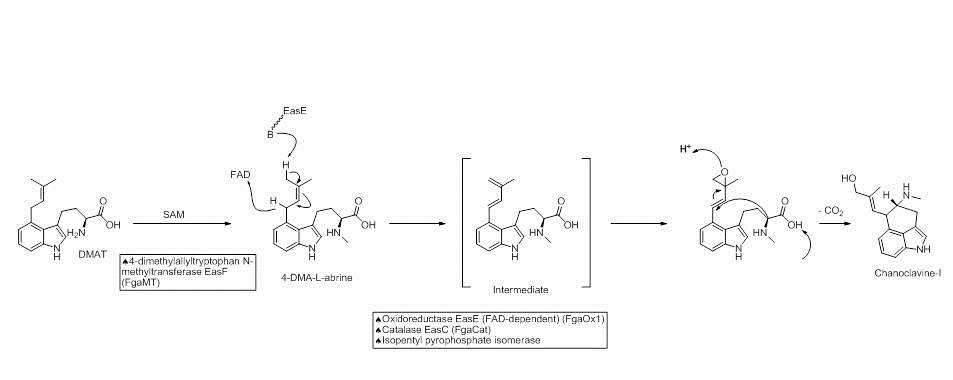

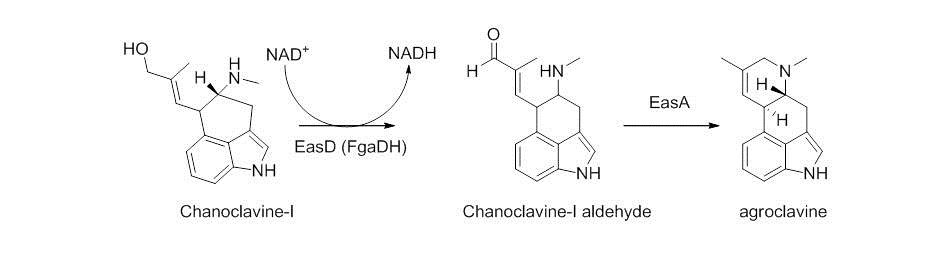

Chanocalvine-I is then oxidized to chanoclavine-I aldehyde with NAD+ dependent enzyme EasD (FgaDH in A. fumigatus). Chanoclavine-I aldehyde is a branch point, leading to different ergot alkaloids, depending on the specific fungus. In C. purpurea, chanoclavine-I aldehyde is converted to agroclavine with EasA, referred to as the old yellow enzyme or FgaOx3. This process occurs via keto-enol tautomerization to facilitate rotation about a carbon-carbon bond, followed by tautomerization back to the aldehyde, and condensation with the proximal secondary amine. The iminium species created by cyclization is then reduced to the tertiary amine, yielding agroclavine.

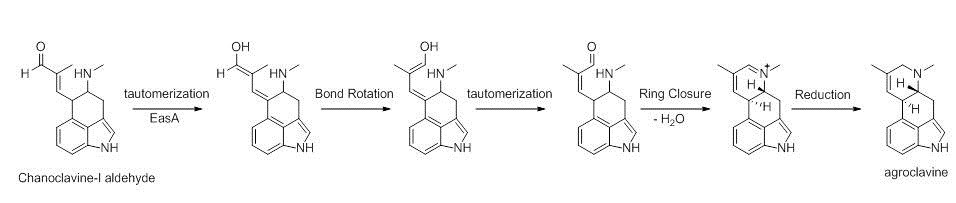

A cytochrome P-450 monooxygenase enzyme catalyzes a two electron oxidation of agroclavine to the corresponding primary alcohol, elymoclavine. Elymoclavine is then oxidized by four electrons by a P450 monooxygenase to give paspalic acid. Paspalic acid then undergoes isomerization of the carbon-carbon double bond that is in conjugation with the acid, to give D-lysergic acid.

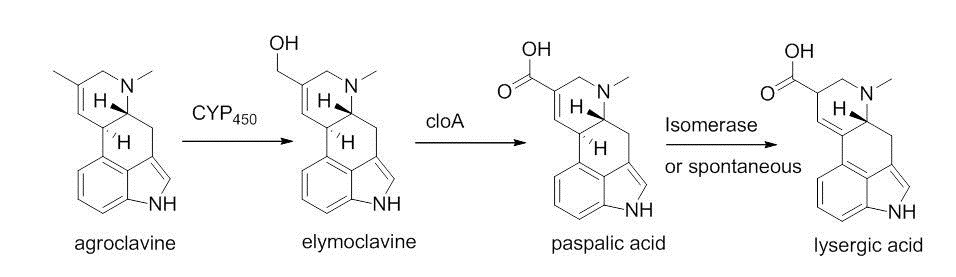

Lysergic Acid is a branch point in the biosynthesis of ergoamides and ergopeptines. On the path to ergocryptine, an ergopeptine, the tripeptide is installed by a Non-Ribosomal Peptide Synthase (NRPS). It has been shown that there are two enzymes, D-lysergyl peptide synthases (LPS) 1 and 2, which are responsible for the tripeptide connection to lysergic acid. The timing of the oxidation of valine to an alcohol is not exactly known. However, it is speculated that the oxidation occurs while bound to the NRPS LPS2. Ergocryptine is found in two forms, differing in the amino acid used by the NRPS. The alpha form contains the amino acid leucine, while the beta-form uses the amino acid isoleucine.

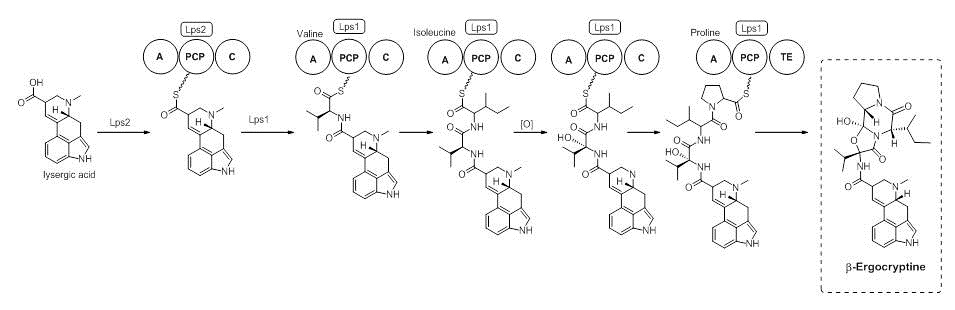

== See also ==
- Dihydroergocryptine
