= Ergocornine =

Chemical compound

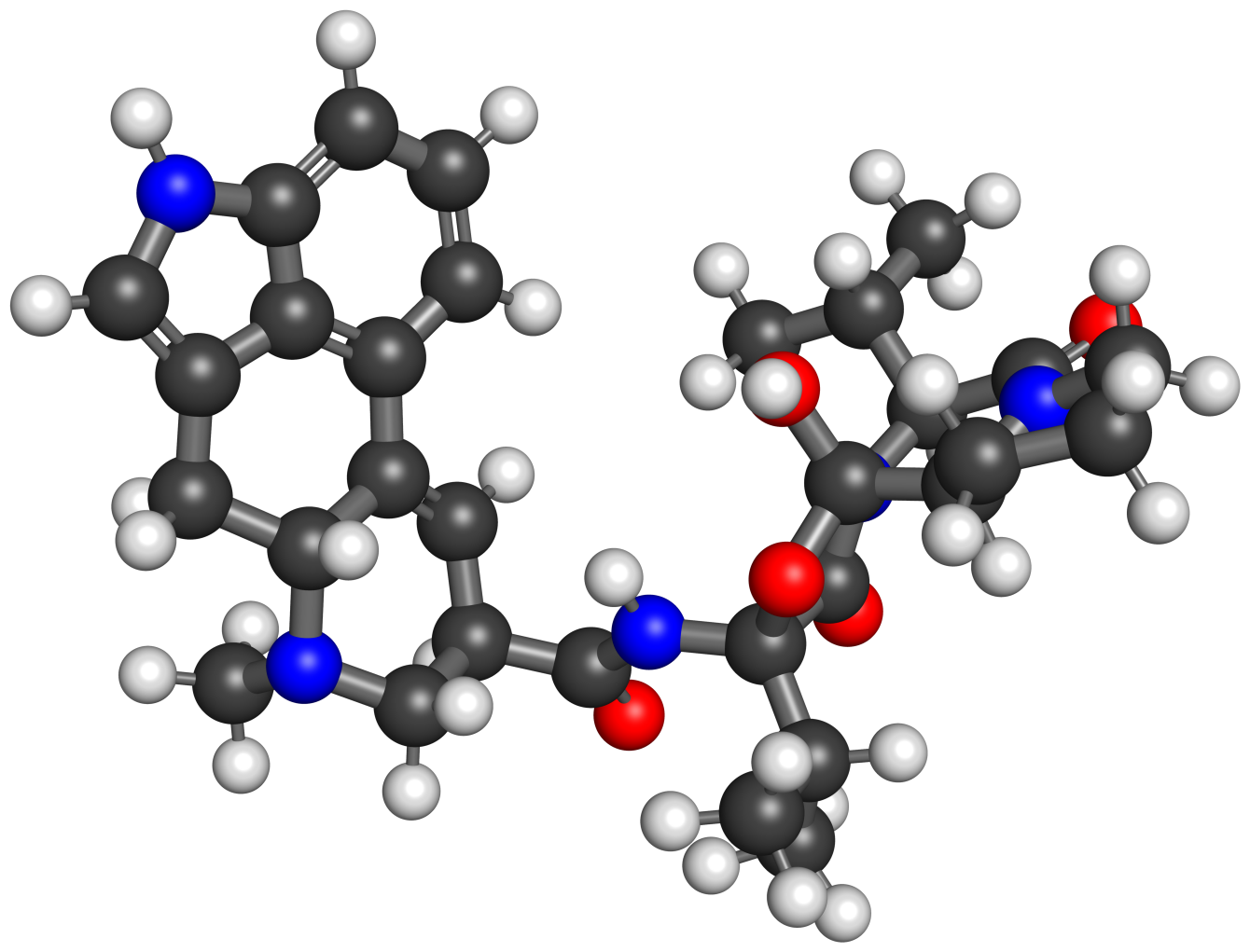

Identifiers
- IUPAC name: 12′-Hydroxy-2′,5′-α-bis(1-methyl-ethyl)ergotaman-3′,6′,18-trione
- CAS Number: 564-36-3
- PubChem CID: 73453
- ChemSpider: 66155
- UNII: 7W36B25464
- CompTox Dashboard (EPA): DTXSID40971841
- ECHA InfoCard: 100.008.430

Chemical and physical data
- Formula: C_{31}H_{39}N_{5}O_{5}
- Molar mass: 561.683 g·mol^{−1}
- 3D model (JSmol): Interactive image
- SMILES: O=C3N1CCC[C@H]1[C@]2(O)O[C@](C(=O)N2[C@H]3C(C)C)(NC(=O)[C@@H]7/C=C6/c4cccc5c4c(c[nH]5)C[C@H]6N(C)C7)C(C)C
- InChI: InChI=1S/C31H39N5O5/c1-16(2)26-28(38)35-11-7-10-24(35)31(40)36(26)29(39)30(41-31,17(3)4)33-27(37)19-12-21-20-8-6-9-22-25(20)18(14-32-22)13-23(21)34(5)15-19/h6,8-9,12,14,16-17,19,23-24,26,32,40H,7,10-11,13,15H2,1-5H3,(H,33,37)/t19-,23-,24+,26+,30-,31+/m1/s1; Key:UJYGDMFEEDNVBF-OGGGUQDZSA-N

Ergocornine is a crystalline ergopeptine and one of the ergot alkaloids separated from ergotoxine. It is also a dopamine receptor agonist. It was discovered by Albert Hofmann, the Swiss chemist who created LSD.
