= DMeOB =

Chemical compound

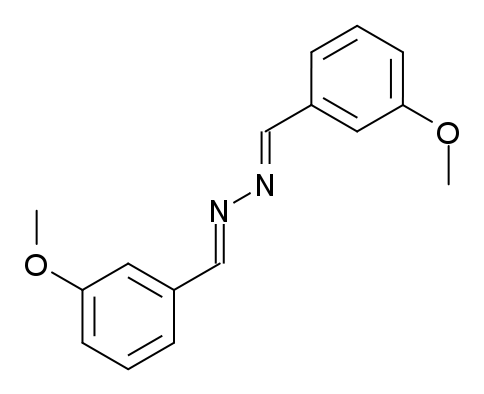

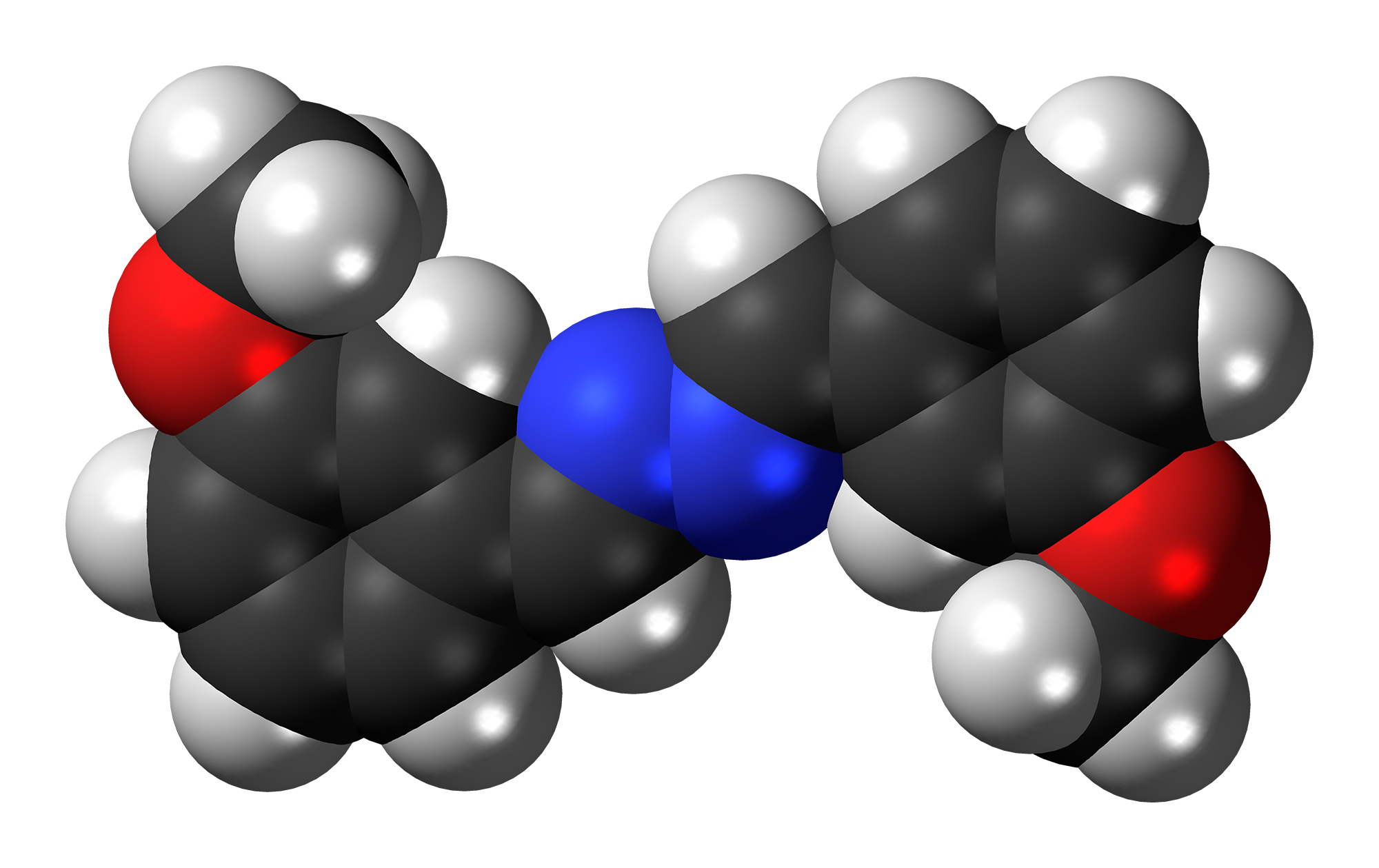

Legal status
- Legal status: AU: <1 -- Unscheduled / S2 / S3 / S4 / S5 / S6 / S7 / S8 / S9 -->

Identifiers
- IUPAC name: 1-(3-methoxyphenyl)-N-[(3-methoxyphenyl)methylideneamino]methanimine
- CAS Number: 40252-74-2
- PubChem CID: 6891506
- ChemSpider: 5277863
- UNII: 4NRP32S46E
- CompTox Dashboard (EPA): DTXSID10425967
- ECHA InfoCard: 100.164.778

Chemical and physical data
- Formula: C_{16}H_{16}N_{2}O_{2}
- Molar mass: 268.316 g·mol^{−1}
- 3D model (JSmol): Interactive image
- SMILES: COc2cc(ccc2)C=NN=Cc1cccc(OC)c1
- InChI: InChI=1S/C16H16N2O2/c1-19-15-7-3-5-13(9-15)11-17-18-12-14-6-4-8-16(10-14)20-2/h3-12H,1-2H3/b17-11+,18-12+; Key:FBNPHFBYHYNMHC-JYFOCSDGSA-N

DMeOB is a drug used in scientific research which acts as a negative allosteric modulator of the metabotropic glutamate receptor subtype mGluR5.
