= Ergosine =

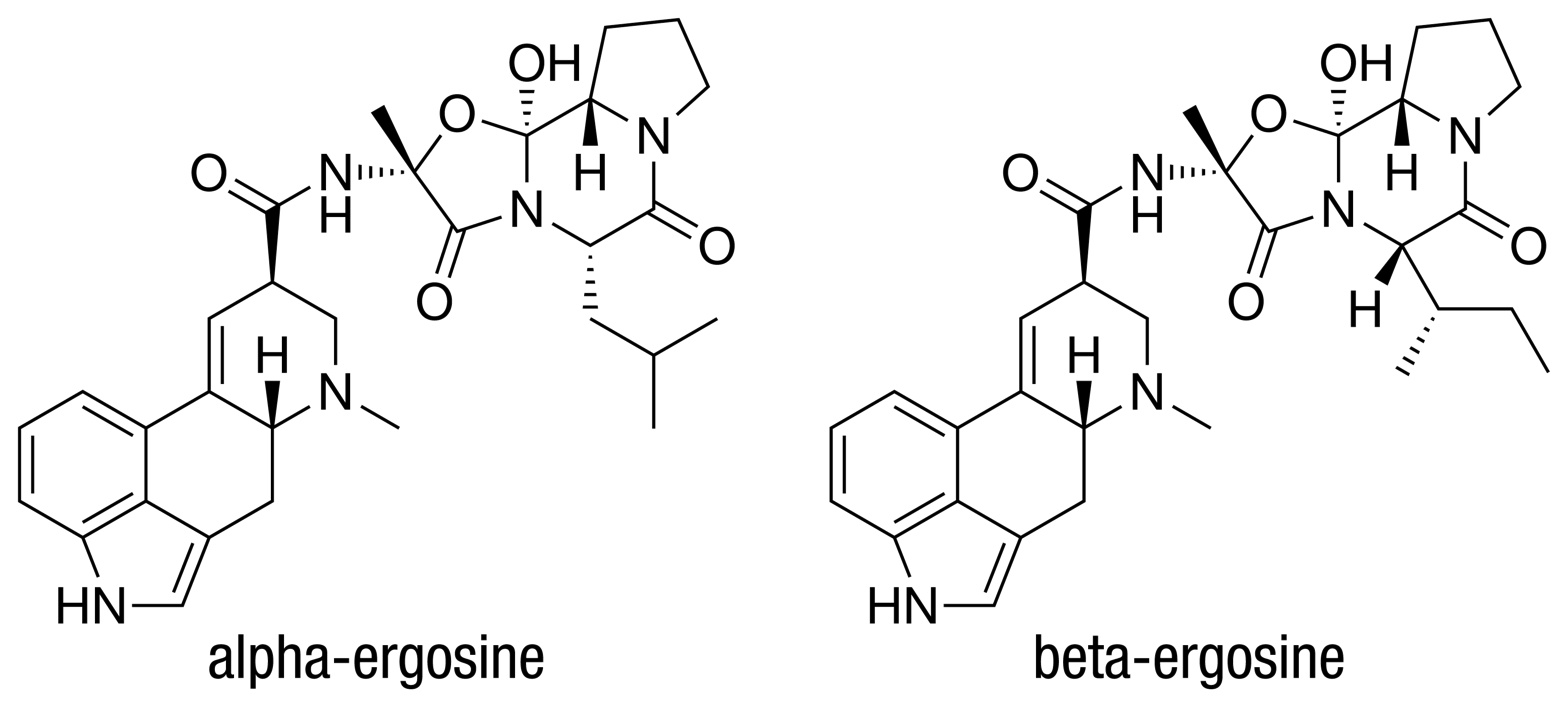
Alpha- and beta-ergosine.

Ergosines are ergoloid-like chemicals made by Claviceps purpurea.
