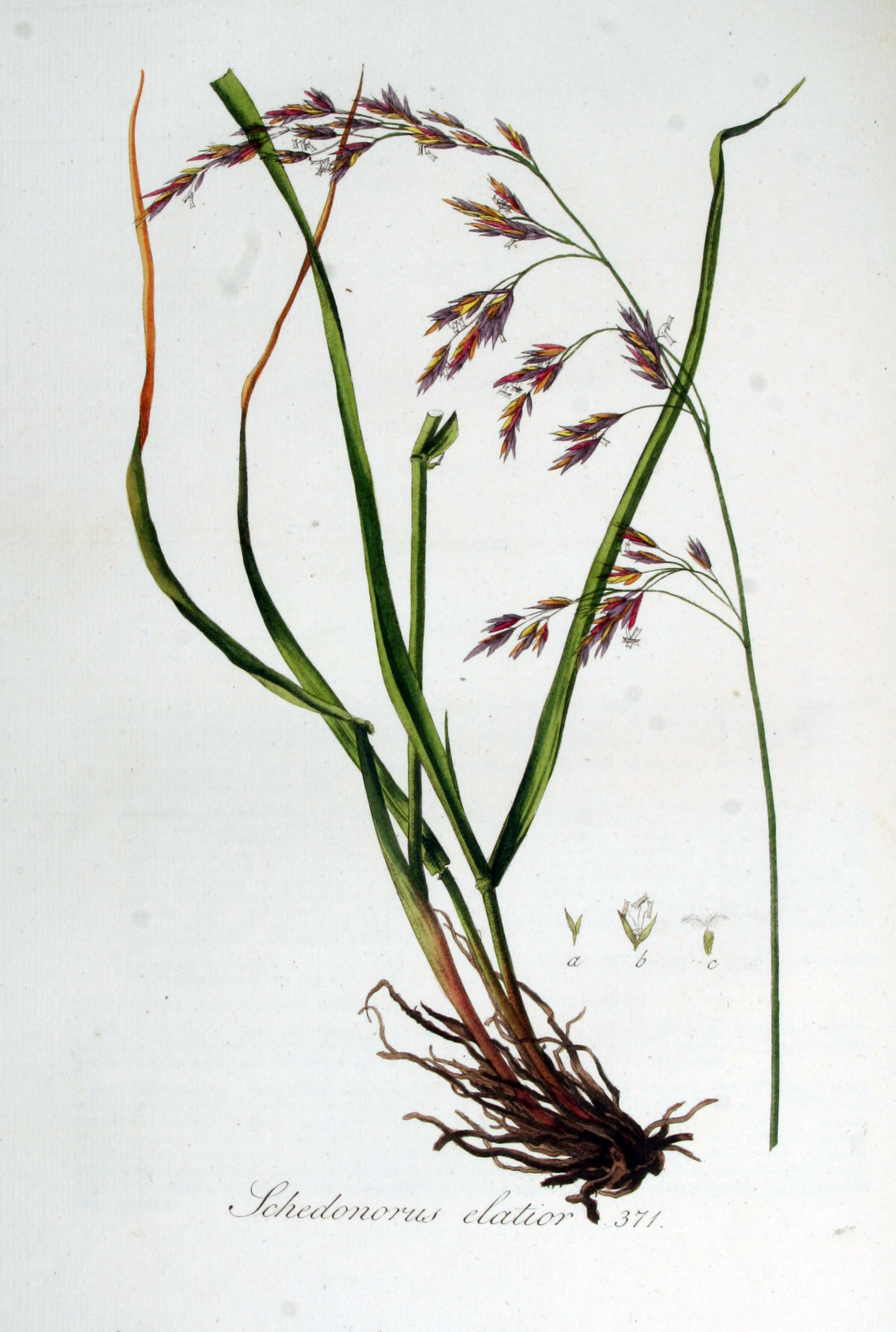

Conservation status
- Unranked (NatureServe)

Scientific classification
- Kingdom: Plantae
- Clade: Embryophytes
- Clade: Tracheophytes
- Clade: Spermatophytes
- Clade: Angiosperms
- Clade: Monocots
- Clade: Commelinids
- Order: Poales
- Family: Poaceae
- Subfamily: Pooideae
- Genus: Lolium
- Species: L. arundinaceum

Binomial name
- Lolium arundinaceum (Schreb.) Darbysh.

Synonyms
- List: Bromus arundinaceus (Schreb.) Roth; Festuca arundinacea Schreb.; Festuca elatior var. arundinacea (Schreb.) Roth; Schedonorus arundinaceus (Schreb.) Dumort.; Schedonorus phoenix (Scop.) Holub

= Lolium arundinaceum =

Species of flowering plant

Lolium arundinaceum, commonly known as tall fescue, is a cool-season, perennial C_{3} grass species native to Europe and introduced to North America and other parts of the world. It naturally occurs in grasslands and coastal marshes. Tall fescue is grown in a range of cultivars, widely used for livestock forage, in lawns and recreational areas as turf, and occasionally for managing soil erosion.

Most publications have used the names Festuca arundinacea or, more recently, Schedonorus arundinaceus for this species, but DNA studies appear to have settled a long debate that it should be included within the genus Lolium instead.

== Description ==
Tall fescue is a long-lived tuft-forming perennial with erect to spreading hollow flowering stems up to about 165 cm (5 ft 5 in) tall (exceptionally up to 200 cm) which are hairless (glabrous), including the leaf sheaths, but with a short (1.5 mm) ligule and slightly hairy (ciliate) pointed auricles that can wrap slightly around the stem. The leaf blade is flat, up to about 10 mm wide, and also glabrous, but rough on both sides and the margins. The tillers (non-flowering stems) are typically shorter but otherwise similar to the culms. The leaves have prominent veins running parallel the entire length of the blade. Emerging leaves are rolled in the bud (convolute vernation). Note that most grasses are folded not rolled, which make this a key identification feature on tall fescue.

Flowering typically occurs from early June until late August, with an erect to slightly nodding open panicle up to about 40 cm (1 ft 4 in) long. The branches are normally in pairs, each of which has 3-18 spikelets, which are 9–15 mm long and comprise 4-8 bisexual florets and two short, unequal glumes. The lower glume has only 1 nerve whereas the upper one has 3. The lemmas typically have a short (3 mm) awn arising just below the tip. Each floret has 3 stamens with anthers about 3–4 mm long. The fruit is a nut or caryopsis with the seed tightly enclosed by the hardened lemma and palea.

== Taxonomy ==
Tall fescue was first described (as Festuca arundinacea) by the German naturalist Johann Christian Daniel von Schreber in 1771. Its inclusion within the genus Festuca was due to the similarity of the flowers and inflorescences. However, there has been much debate since 1898 about its relationship to the genus Lolium, largely because of hybridization with Lolium perenne (species in separate genera are far less likely to form hybrids than those within the same genus). Recent DNA studies have shown that it should indeed be considered a ryegrass (Lolium) rather than a fescue (Festuca) because these species are more closely related to each other, despite the fact that ryegrasses have inflorescences of spikes rather than panicles.

Its chromosome number is 2n = 42.

== Distribution and status ==
Tall fescue is native to Europe, West Asia and North Africa. It was introduced to North and South America, Australia and Southeast Asia. It is widespread in the United States. Occurs in fields, meadows, waste areas and pastures. The cultivated species has become a common sight in California grasslands and habitats, such as the California coastal prairie plant community, since its introduction this species has been a topic of debate.

== Habitat and ecology ==
In its native European environment, tall fescue is found in damp grasslands, river banks, and coastal areas. The British National Vegetation Classification lists it as a minor component in a range of grassland types, but it is particularly characteristic of its own MG12 Festuca arundinacea community, which is a tussocky type of pasture that occurs in brackish grazing marshes around the south and west coasts. This vegetation type is also home to some uncommon plants such as parsley water-dropwort and slender spike-rush. Tall fescue is also found in a number of salt marsh and maritime cliff communities. In New Zealand, where it is introduced, the species is particularly prolific in salt marshes, where it is often dominant. Native to Europe, tall fescue has established itself in introduced regions like North America, where it thrives in habitats such as grasslands, wetlands, riparian corridors, and marshy landscapes.

Its Ellenberg values in Britain are L = 8, F = 6, R = 7, N = 6, and S = 1, which show that it favours damp, brightly sunny places with neutral soils and moderate fertility, and that it can occur in slightly brackish situations.

=== Endophyte association ===
Tall fescue can be found growing in most soils of the southeast including marginal, acidic, and poorly drained soils and in areas of low fertility, and where stresses occur due to drought and overgrazing. These beneficial attributes are now known to be due in part to a symbiotic association with the fungus Epichloë coenophiala,(formerly Neotyphodium coenophialum).

This association between tall fescue and the fungal endophyte is a mutualistic symbiotic relationship (both symbionts derive benefits from it). The fungus remains completely intercellular, growing between the cells of the aboveground parts of its grass host. The fungus is asexual, and is transmitted to new generations of tall fescue only through seed, a mode known as vertical transmission. Thus in nature, the fungus does not live outside the plant. Viability of the fungus in seeds is limited; typically, after a year or two of seed storage the fungal endophyte mycelium has died, and seeds germinated will result in plants that are endophyte-free.

The tall fescue–endophyte symbiosis confers a competitive advantage to the plant. Endophyte-infected tall fescue compared to endophyte-free tall fescue deters herbivory by insects and mammals, bestows drought resistance, and disease resistance. In return for shelter, seed transmission, and nutrients the endophyte produces secondary metabolites. These metabolites, namely alkaloids, are responsible for increased plant fitness. Alkaloids in endophytic tall fescue include 1-aminopyrrolizidines (lolines), ergot alkaloids (clavines, lysergic acids, and derivative alkaloids), and the pyrrolopyrazine, peramine.

Core structure of the 1-aminopyrrolizidines (loline alkaloids) produced in tall fescue infected by Neotyphodium coenophialum; R' and R'' denote variable substituents that can include methyl, formyl, and acetyl groups giving rise to different loline species.

The lolines are the most abundant alkaloids, with concentrations 1000 higher than those of ergot alkaloids. Endophyte-free grasses do not produce lolines, and, as shown for the closely related endophyte commonly occurring in meadow fescue, Neotyphodium uncinatum, the endophyte can produce lolines in axenic laboratory culture. However, although N. coenophialum possesses all the genes for loline biosynthesis, it does not produce lolines in culture. So in the tall fescue symbiosis, only the interaction of the host and endophyte produces the lolines. Lolines have been shown to deter insect herbivory, and may cause various other responses in higher organisms. Despite their lower concentrations, ergot alkaloids appear to significantly affect animal growth. Ergots cause changes in normal homeostatic mechanisms in animals that result in toxicity manifested through reduced weight gains, elevated core temperatures, restricted blood flow, reduced milk production and reproductive problems. Peramine, like the ergot alkaloids, is found in much lower concentrations in the host compared with loline alkaloids. Its activity has been shown to be primarily insecticidal, and has not been linked to toxicity in mammals or other herbivores.

== Uses ==
Tall fescue was introduced into the United States in the late 19th century, but it did not establish itself as a widely used perennial forage until the 1940s. As in Europe, tall fescue has become an important, well-adapted cool season forage grass for agriculture in the US with many cultivars. In addition to forage, it has become an important grass for turf and soil conservation. Tall fescue is the most heat tolerant of the major cool season grasses. Tall fescue has a deep root system compared to other cool season grasses. This non-native grass is well adapted to the "transition zone" Mid-Atlantic and Southeastern United States and now occupies over 35,000,000 acres (140,000 km^{2}). In addition to serving as forage and turf grass, tall fescue is sometimes planted to stabilize soil, benefiting from its robust root network and adaptability to different environments.

The dominant cultivar grown in the United States is Kentucky 31. In 1931 E. N. Fergus, a professor of agronomy at the University of Kentucky, collected seed from a population on a hillside in Menifee County, Kentucky although formal cultivar release did not happen until 1943. Fergus heard about this "wonder grass" while judging a sorghum syrup competition in a nearby town. He wanted to see this grass because it was green, lush, and growing well on a sloped hillside during a drought. While visiting the site he was impressed and took seed samples with him. With this seed he conducted variety trials, initiated seed increase nurseries, and lauded its performance. It was released as Kentucky 31 in 1943 and today it dominates grasslands in the humid southeastern US. In 1943, Fergus and others recognized this tall fescue cultivar as being vigorous, widely adaptable, able to withstand poor soil conditions, resistant to pests and drought. It is used primarily in pastures and low maintenance situations.

Breeders have created numerous cultivars that are dark green with desirable narrower blades than the light green coarse bladed K-31. Tall fescue is the grass on the South Lawn of the White House.

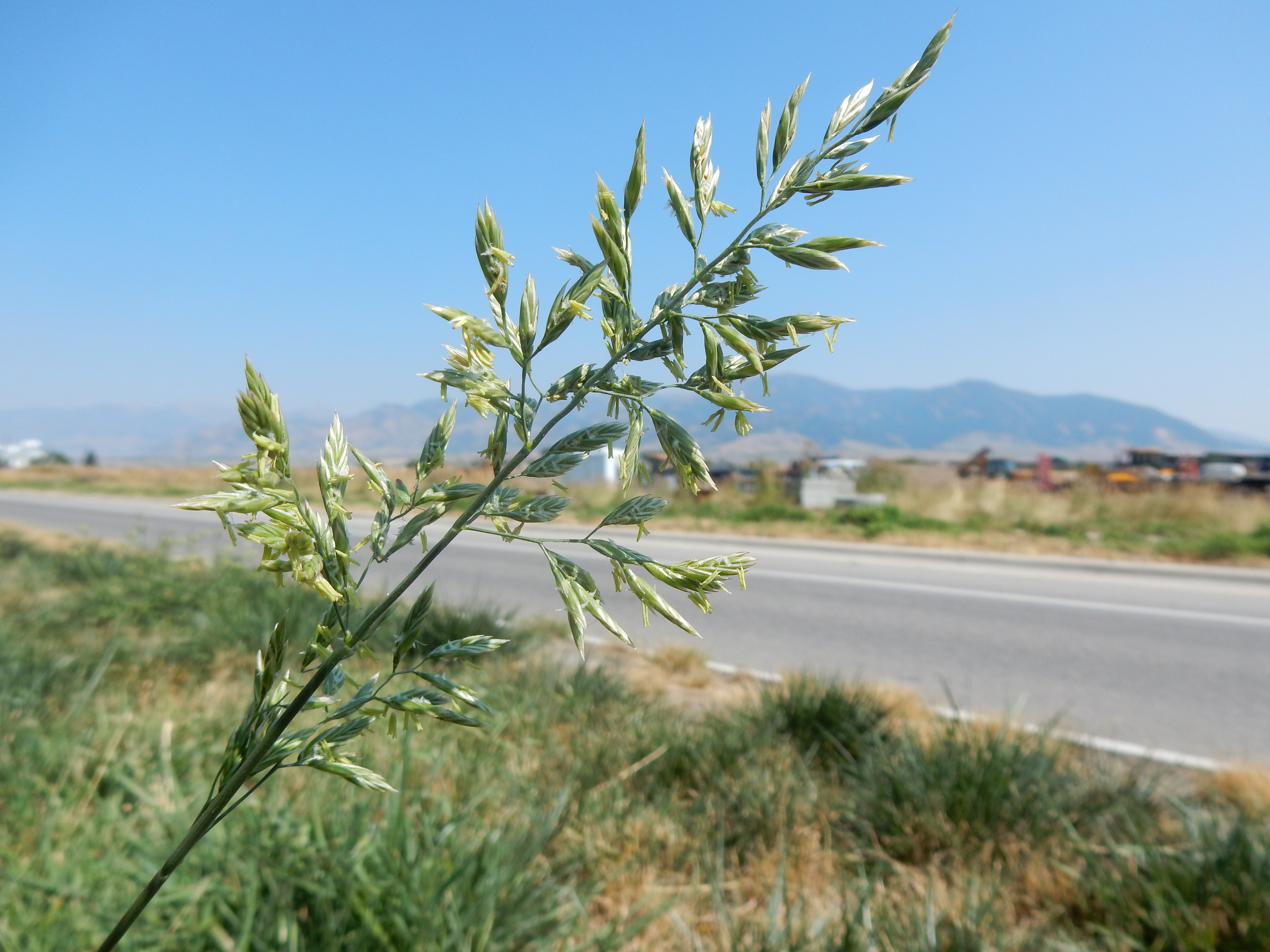

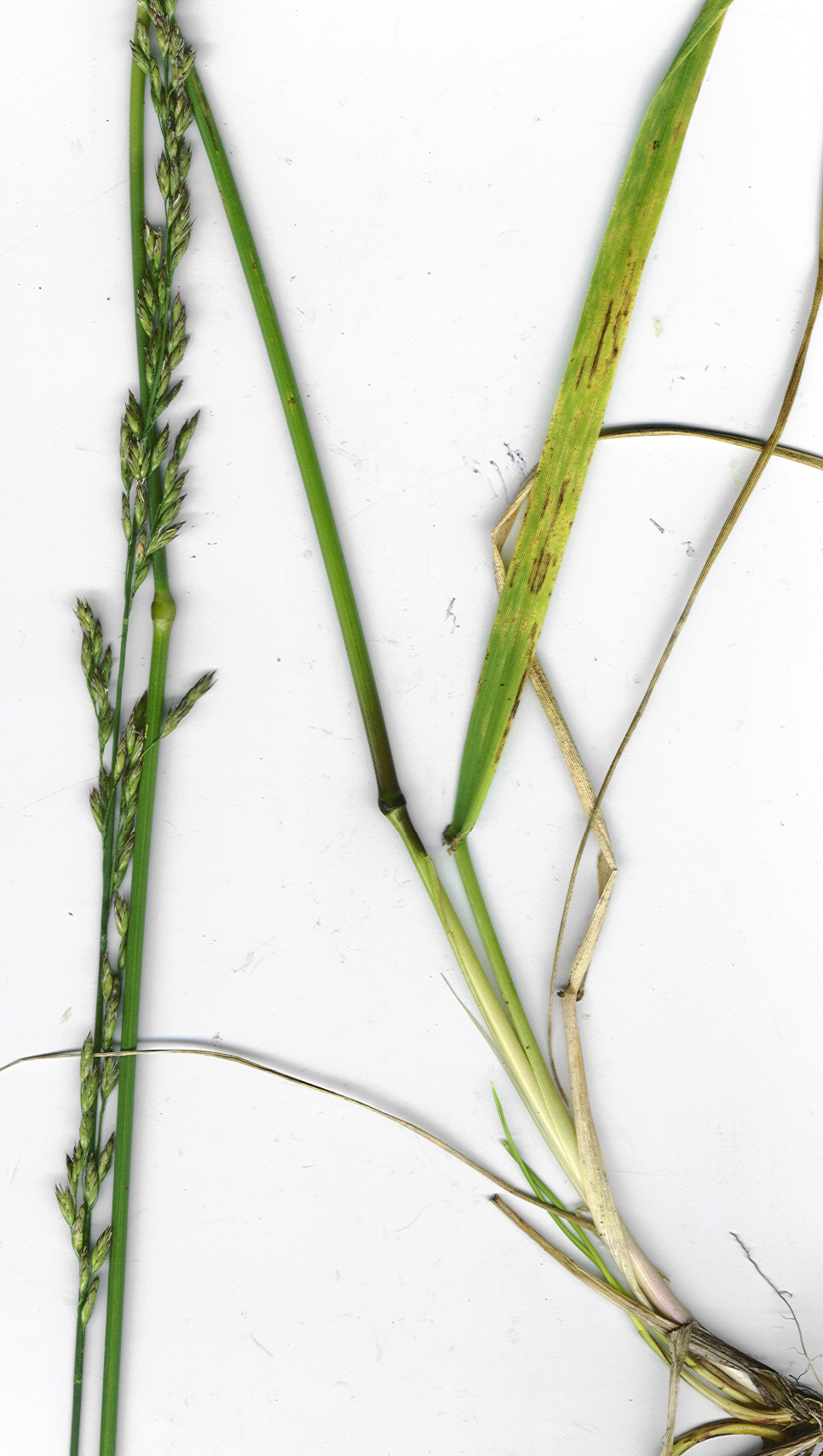

The predominant cultivar found in British pastures is S170.

== Endophyte infected tall fescue effects on animals ==
=== Broodmares and foals ===
Horses are especially prone to reproductive problems associated with tall fescue, often resulting in death of the foal, mare, or both. Horses which are pregnant may be strongly affected by alkaloids produced by the tall fescue symbiont. Broodmares that forage on infected fescue may have prolonged gestation, foaling difficulty, thickened placenta, or impaired lactation. In addition, the foals may be born weakened or dead. To moderate toxicosis, it is recommended that pregnant mares should be taken off infected tall fescue pasture for 60–90 days before foaling as late gestation problems are most common.

=== Cattle ===
Fescue toxicity in cattle appears as roughening of the coat in the summer and intolerance to heat. Cattle that graze on tall fescue are more likely to stay in the shade or wade in the water in hot weather. In the winter, a condition known as "fescue foot" might afflict cattle. This results from vasoconstriction of the blood vessels especially in the extremities, and causes a gangrenous condition. Untreated, the hoof might slough off. Additionally, cattle may experience decreased weight gains and poor milk production when heavily grazing infected tall fescue pasture. To deter toxicosis cattle should be given alternative feed to dilute their infected tall fescue intake.

== Nutrient pools under tall fescue pasture ==
Carbon cycling in terrestrial ecosystems is a major focus of research. Terrestrial carbon sequestration is the process of removing carbon dioxide from the atmosphere via photosynthesis and storing this carbon in either plant or soil carbon pools. Increases in soil organic carbon help aggregate the soil, increase infiltration, reduce erosion, increase soil fertility, and act as long lived pools of soil carbon. Many studies have suggested that long term endophyte-infected tall fescue plots increase soil carbon storage in the soil by limiting the microbial and macrofaunal activity to break down endophyte infected organic matter input and by increasing inputs of carbon via plant production. While the long-term studies tend to show an increase in carbon storage, the short-term studies do not. However, short-term studies have shown that the endophyte association results in higher above- and belowground plant biomass production compared to uninfected plants, as well as a decrease in certain microbial communities. Site-specific characteristics, such as management and climate, need to be further understood to realize the ecological role and potential benefits of tall fescue and the endophyte association as it relates to carbon sequestration.

== Novel endophytes ==
New cultivars are being bred and tested every year. A major focus of research is producing endophyte-infected tall fescue cultivars that have no detrimental effects to livestock while keeping the endophytic effects of reduced insect herbivory, disease resistance, drought tolerance, and extended growing season. Novel endophytes, also referred to as "friendly" endophytes, are symbiotic fungi that are associated with tall fescue, but do not produce target alkaloids in toxic concentrations. A widely used and tested novel endophyte is called MaxQ and is grown in the tall fescue grass host Georgia-Jesup. This cultivar of tall fescue-novel endophyte combination produces ergot alkaloids at near zero levels while maintaining the concentration of other alkaloids.

== See also ==
- Lawn
- Sod
- Invasive grasses of North America
