= Ergoline =

Chemical compound

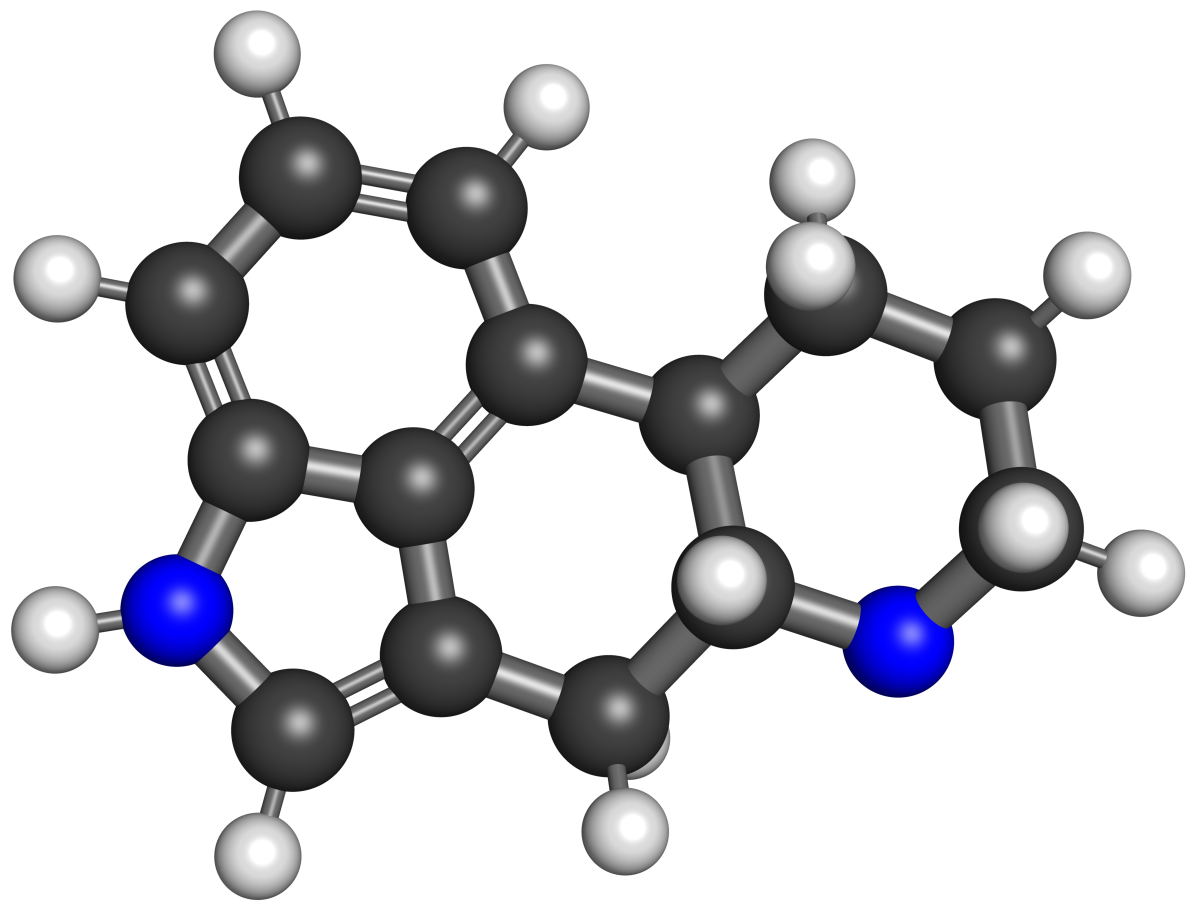

Clinical data
- ATC code: None

Identifiers
- IUPAC name: (6aR)-4,6,6a,7,8,9,10,10a-Octahydroindolo[4,3-fg]quinoline
- CAS Number: 478-88-6
- PubChem CID: 6857537
- ChemSpider: 5256873
- UNII: D5RC6H62GW
- ChEBI: CHEBI:38484
- CompTox Dashboard (EPA): DTXSID00963944

Chemical and physical data
- Formula: C_{14}H_{16}N_{2}
- Molar mass: 212.296 g·mol^{−1}
- 3D model (JSmol): Interactive image
- SMILES: [H][C@@]34Cc1c[nH]c2cccc(c12)[C@@]3([H])CCCN4
- InChI: InChI=1S/C14H16N2/c1-3-11-10-4-2-6-15-13(10)7-9-8-16-12(5-1)14(9)11/h1,3,5,8,10,13,15-16H,2,4,6-7H2/t10-,13-/m1/s1; Key:RHGUXDUPXYFCTE-ZWNOBZJWSA-N

Ergoline is a core structure in many alkaloids and their synthetic derivatives. Ergoline alkaloids were first characterized in ergot. Some of these are implicated in the condition of ergotism, which can take a convulsive form or a gangrenous form. Even so, many ergoline alkaloids have been found to be clinically useful. Annual world production of ergot alkaloids has been estimated at 5,000–8,000 kg of all ergopeptines and 10,000–15,000 kg of lysergic acid, used primarily in the manufacture of semi-synthetic derivatives.

Others, such as lysergic acid diethylamide, better known as LSD, a semi-synthetic derivative, and ergine, a natural derivative found in Argyreia nervosa, Ipomoea tricolor and related species, are known psychedelic substances.

== Natural occurrence ==
Ergoline alkaloids are found in fungi such as Claviceps purpurea, Claviceps paspali, and the related Periglandula, which have a permanent, symbiotic bond with numerous flowering vines, most notably, Turbina corymbosa and Ipomoea tricolor (“morning glory”). Ergolines are concentrated in the seeds, which have been used by indigenous Central/South Americans (i.e. T. corymbosa seeds are known as ololiuhqui) The principal alkaloids in the seeds appear to be ergine and isoergine, decomposition products of lysergic acid hydroxyethylamide, isolysergic hydroxyethylamide, lysergic acid hydroxymethylethylamide (syn. ergonovine), and isolysergic acid hydroxymethylethylamide (syn. ergonovinine). Other ergolines have been quantified as trace constituents except penniclavine, which was found to be the predominant ergoline in a 2016 assay of I. tricolor seeds. Ergolines have been identified in 42 Ipomoea species. Among the ergolines from these seeds trialed in vivo as isolates are ergine, ergonovine, and lysergol, with lysergol showing the weakest effect (refs: Ergine / Psychedelic Effects, Ergometrine / Psychedelic Effects).

== History ==
Ergoline alkaloids were first isolated from ergot, a fungus that infects rye and causes ergotism or St. Anthony's fire. Reports of the toxic effects due to ergoline alkaloids date back to the 12th century. Ergot also has a long history of medicinal use, which led to attempts to characterize its activity chemically. First reports of its use date back to 1582, where preparations of ergot were used in small doses by midwives to induce strong uterine contractions. The first use of ergoline alkaloids in modern medicine was described in 1808 by John Stearns, an American physician, who had reported on the uterine contractile actions of a preparation of ergot as a remedy for "quickening birth".

Attempts to characterize the activity of ergoline alkaloids began in 1907, with the isolation of ergotoxine by G. Barger and F. H. Carrin. However, the industrial production of ergot alkaloids didn't begin until 1918, when Arthur Stoll patented the isolation of ergotamine tartrate, which was marketed by Sandoz in 1921. Following the determination of the basic chemical structure of the ergot alkaloids in 1930, an era of intensive exploration of synthetic derivatives began and industrial production of ergoline alkaloids exploded, with Sandoz continuing to be the leading company in their production worldwide, up until 1950 when other competitors arose. The company, now renamed Novartis, still retains its leadership in the product of ergot alkaloids. In 1943, Arthur Stoll and Albert Hofmann reported the first total synthesis of an ergot alkaloid, ergometrine. Though the synthesis found no industrial application, this was a huge leap forward in the industry.

== Uses ==
There are a variety of clinically useful ergoline derivatives for the purpose of vasoconstriction, the treatment of migraines, and treatment of Parkinson's disease. Ergoline alkaloids found their place in pharmacology long before modern medicine as preparations of ergot were often used by midwives in the 12th century to stimulate childbirth. Following Arthur Stoll's isolation of ergometrine, the therapeutic use of ergoline derivatives became well explored.

The induction of uterine contractions via the preparation of ergot was attributed to ergonovine, an ergoline derivative found in ergot, which is a powerful oxytocic. From this, methergine, a synthetic derivative, was elucidated. While used to facilitate child birth, ergoline derivatives can pass into breast milk and should not be used during breastfeeding. They are uterine contractors that can increase the risk of miscarriage during pregnancy.

Another example of medically relevant ergoline alkaloids is ergotamine, an alkaloid also found in ergot. It acts as a vasoconstrictor and has been reported to control migraines. From ergotamine, the anti-migraine drugs dihydroergotamine and methysergide were developed by Albert Hofmann.

Ergoline derivatives, such as hydergine, a mixture of dihydroergotoxine mesylates or ergoline mesylates, have also been used in the treatment of dementia. The use of these alkaloids in the treatment of Parkinson's disease has also been prominent. Drugs such as bromocriptine act as a dopamine receptor agonist, stimulating the nerves that control movement. Newer synthetic ergoline derivatives that have been synthesized for the treatment of Parkinson's disease include pergolide and lisuride, which both act as dopamine agonists as well.

A famous ergoline derivative is the psychedelic drug LSD, a semi-synthetic ergoline alkaloid that was discovered by Albert Hofmann. LSD is considered a Schedule I controlled substance. Ergometrine and ergotamine are included as schedule I precursors in the United Nations Convention Against Illicit Traffic in Narcotic Drugs and Psychotropic Substances.

== Mechanism of action ==
The mechanism of ergoline alkaloids varies for each derivative. A variety of modifications can be made to the ergoline skeleton to produce medically relevant derivatives. Types of potential ergoline-based drugs include dopaminergic, antidopaminergic, serotonergic, and antiserotonergic. Ergoline alkaloids often interfere with multiple receptor sites, leading to negative side effects and adding to the challenge of drug development.

=== Dopaminergic/antidopaminergic ===
Ergolines, such as ergotoxin, have been reported to inhibit the deciduoma reaction, which is reversed through injection of progesterone. Thus, it was concluded that ergotoxin, and related ergolines, act via the hypothalamus and pituitary gland to inhibit the secretion of prolactin. Drugs such as bromocriptine interact with the dopaminergic receptor sites as agonists with selectivity for D_{2} receptors, making them effective in treating Parkinson's disease. While the part of the ergoline alkaloid structure responsible for dopaminergic properties has yet to be identified, some reason that it is due to the pyroleethylamine moiety while others assert that it is due to the indoleethylamine partial structure.

Antidopaminergic ergolines have found use in antiemetics and in the treatment of schizophrenia. These substances are neuroleptic and are either an antagonist of dopamine at the postsynaptic level at the D_{2} receptor site or an agonist of dopamine at the presynaptic level at the D_{1} receptor site. The antagonist or agonist behavior of the ergolines are substrate dependent and mixed agonist/antagonist behaviors of ergoline derivatives have been reported.

=== Serotonergic/antiserotonergic ===
The primary challenges of developing serotonergic/antiserotonergic ergolines is attributed to serotonin, or 5-HT, acting on various distinct receptor sites. Similarly, ergoline alkaloids have been shown to exhibit both 5-HT agonist and antagonist behaviors for multiple receptors, such as metergoline, a 5-HT_{1A} agonist/5-HT_{2A} antagonist, and mesulergine, a 5-HT_{2A/2C} antagonist. The selectivity and affinity of ergolines for certain 5-HT receptors can be improved by introducing a bulky group on the phenyl ring of the ergoline skeleton, which would prevent the interaction of ergoline derivatives with receptors. This methodology has been used to develop selective 5-HT_{1A} and 5-HT_{2A} ergolines in particular.

== Ergoline derivatives ==
There are three main classes of ergoline derivatives, or substituted ergolines: (1) the water-soluble amides of lysergic acid (i.e., lysergamides); (2) the water-insoluble ergopeptines (i.e., ergopeptides); and (3) the clavine group. Only the lysergamides have been known to have psychedelic effects.

=== Lysergic acid amides ===
- Ergine (LSA, D-lysergic acid amide, LAA, LA-111)
  - IUPAC name: 9,10-didehydro-6-methylergoline-8beta-carboxamide
  - CAS number: 478-94-4
- Ergonovine (ergobasine)
  - INN: ergometrine
  - IUPAC name: (8beta(S))-9,10-didehydro-N-(2-hydroxy-1-methylethyl)-6-methyl-ergoline-8-carboxamide
  - CAS number: 60-79-7
- Methergine (ME-277)
  - INN: methylergometrine
  - IUPAC name: (8beta(S))-9,10-didehydro-N-(1-(hydroxymethyl)propyl)-6-methyl-ergoline-8-carboxamide
  - CAS number: 113-42-8
- Methysergide (UML-491)
  - INN: methysergide
  - IUPAC name: (8beta)-9,10-didehydro-N-(1-(hydroxymethyl)propyl)-1,6-dimethyl-ergoline-8-carboxamide
  - CAS number: 361-37-5
- LSD (D-lysergic acid diethylamide, LSD-25)
  - INN: lysergide
  - IUPAC name: (8beta)-9,10-didehydro-N,N-diethyl-6-methyl-ergoline-8-carboxamide
  - CAS number: 50-37-3
- LSH (D-lysergic acid α-hydroxyethylamide)
  - IUPAC name: 9,10-didehydro-N-(1-hydroxyethyl)-6-methylergoline-8-carboxamide
  - CAS number: 3343-15-5

The relationship between these compounds is summarized in the following structural formula and table of substitutions.

Substituted ergine (structural formula).

Name	R^{1}	R^{2}	R^{3}
Ergine	H	H	H
Ergonovine	H	CH(CH_{3})CH_{2}OH	H
Methergine	H	CH(CH_{2}CH_{3})CH_{2}OH	H
Methysergide	CH_{3}	CH(CH_{2}CH_{3})CH_{2}OH	H
LSD	H	CH_{2}CH_{3}	CH_{2}CH_{3}

=== Peptide alkaloids ===
Peptide ergot alkaloids or ergopeptines (also known as ergopeptides) are ergoline derivatives that contain a tripeptide structure attached to the basic ergoline ring in the same location as the amide group of the lysergic acid derivatives. This structure consists of proline and two other α-amino acids, linked in an unusual cyclol formation >N-C(OH)< with the carboxyl carbon of proline, at the juncture between the two lactam rings. Some of the important ergopeptines are summarized below. In addition to the following ergopeptines, a commonly encountered term is ergotoxine, which refers to a mixture of equal proportions of ergocristine, ergocornine and ergocryptine, the latter being a 2:1 mixture of alpha- and beta-ergocryptine. Ergopeptines are considered to be the most toxic and are capable of inducing gangrene: “The low molecular ergolines are lacking the complex peptide moiety, which is apparently responsible for the persistence of the ergopeptines at the receptor molecules.”

- Ergotoxine group (valine as the amino acid attached to the ergoline moiety, at R^{2} below)
  - Ergocristine
    - IUPAC name: Ergotaman-3',6',18-trione, 12'-hydroxy-2'-(1-methylethyl)-5'-(phenylmethyl)-, (5'-alpha)-
    - CAS number: 511-08-0
  - Ergocornine
    - IUPAC name: Ergotaman-3',6',18-trione, 12'-hydroxy-2',5'-bis(1-methylethyl)-, (5'-alpha)-
    - CAS number: 564-36-3
  - alpha-Ergocryptine
    - IUPAC name: Ergotaman-3',6',18-trione, 12'-hydroxy-2'-(1-methylethyl)-5'-(2-methylpropyl)-, (5'alpha)-
    - CAS number: 511-09-1
  - beta-Ergocryptine
    - IUPAC name: Ergotaman-3',6',18-trione, 12'-hydroxy-2'-(1-methylethyl)-5'-(1-methylpropyl)-, (5'alpha(S))-
    - CAS number: 20315-46-2
- Ergotamine group (alanine at R^{2})
  - Ergotamine
    - IUPAC name: Ergotaman-3',6',18-trione, 12'-hydroxy-2'-methyl-5'-(phenylmethyl)-, (5'-alpha)-
    - CAS number: 113-15-5
  - Ergovaline
    - IUPAC name: Ergotaman-3',6',18-trione, 12'-hydroxy-2'-methyl-5'-(1-methylethyl)-, (5'alpha)-
    - CAS number: 2873-38-3
  - alpha-Ergosine
    - IUPAC name: Ergotaman-3',6',18-trione, 12'-hydroxy-2'-methyl-5'-(2-methylpropyl)-, (5'-alpha)-
    - CAS number: 561-94-4
  - beta-Ergosine
    - IUPAC name: Ergotaman-3',6',18-trione, 12'-hydroxy-2'-methyl-5'-(1-methylpropyl)-, (5'-alpha(S))-
    - CAS number: 60192-59-8

Ergopeptides (structural formula)

Name	R^{1}	R^{2}	R^{3}	Amino acid at R^{2}	Amino acid at R^{3}
Ergocristine		CH(CH_{3})_{2}	benzyl	Valine	Phenylalanine
Ergocornine		CH(CH_{3})_{2}	CH(CH_{3})_{2}	Valine	Valine
alpha-Ergocryptine		CH(CH_{3})_{2}	CH_{2}CH(CH_{3})_{2}	Valine	Leucine
beta-Ergocryptine		CH(CH_{3})_{2}	CH(CH_{3})CH_{2}CH_{3} (S)	Valine	Isoleucine
Ergotamine		CH_{3}	benzyl	Alanine	Phenylalanine
Ergovaline		CH_{3}	CH(CH_{3})_{2}	Alanine	Valine
alpha-Ergosine		CH_{3}	CH_{2}CH(CH_{3})_{2}	Alanine	Leucine
beta-Ergosine		CH_{3}	CH(CH_{3})CH_{2}CH_{3} (S)	Alanine	Isoleucine
Bromocriptine (semisynthetic)	Br	CH(CH_{3})_{2}	CH_{2}CH(CH_{3})_{2}	Valine	Leucine

=== Clavines ===
A variety of modifications to the basic ergoline are seen in nature, for example agroclavine, elymoclavine, lysergol. Those deriving from dimethylergoline are referred to as clavines. Examples of clavines, include festuclavine, fumigaclavine A, fumigaclavine B and fumigaclavine C.

=== Others ===
Some ergoline derivatives do not fall easily into any of the above groups. Some examples are:

Lisuride (INN)

- IUPAC name: 3-(9,10-didehydro-6-methylergolin-8α-yl)-1,1-diethylurea
- CAS number: 18016-80-3

==== Substituted 9,10-dihydroergolines ====
In the scientific literature, the term ‘substituted 9,10-dihydroergolines’ has sometimes been used; most often, the substitution was understood to refer to the 8-position of the ergoline, although substitution occurs by no means only at the 8-carbon position. ‘9, 10 -dihydroergolines’ here refers not so much to a hydrogenated bond at the 9- and 10-positions (ergoline is already saturated at positions 9 and 10) as to distinguishing this from the umbrella term ‘substituted ergolines’, which may include compounds having a double bond between the 9th and 10th carbon atoms (as in the case of classical ergot alkaloids or semi-synthetic or synthetic analogues)

=== Others ===
- Cabergoline (INN)
  - IUPAC name: 1-[(6-Allylergolin-8β-yl)-carbonyl]-1-[3-(dimethylamino)propyl]-3-ethylurea
  - CAS number: 81409-90-7
- Pergolide (INN)
  - IUPAC name: (8β)-8-((methylthio)methyl)-6-propyl-ergoline
  - CAS number: 66104-22-1

== Ergologs ==
Ergologs are analogues of ergolines. Examples include RU-29717, FCE-24379, JRT, LSD-Quinoline, and partial ergolines like NDTDI.

== See also ==
- Ergotism
- Ergot
- Morning glory (drug)
- LSD
- Ergine
- Albert Hofmann
