= Paspalic acid =

Clinical data
- Other names: Paspalate; 8,9-Didehydro-6-methylergoline-8-carboxylic acid; Δ^{8}-Lysergic acid; Δ^{8,9}-Lysergic acid
- ATC code: None

Identifiers
- IUPAC name: (6aR,10aR)-7-methyl-6,6a,8,10a-tetrahydro-4H-indolo[4,3-fg]quinoline-9-carboxylic acid
- CAS Number: 5516-88-1
- PubChem CID: 21692
- ChemSpider: 20388
- UNII: P81DUK4Q2L
- KEGG: C22432
- CompTox Dashboard (EPA): DTXSID20203672

Chemical and physical data
- Formula: C_{16}H_{16}N_{2}O_{2}
- Molar mass: 268.316 g·mol^{−1}
- 3D model (JSmol): Interactive image
- SMILES: CN1CC(=C[C@H]2[C@H]1CC3=CNC4=CC=CC2=C34)C(=O)O
- InChI: InChI=1S/C16H16N2O2/c1-18-8-10(16(19)20)5-12-11-3-2-4-13-15(11)9(7-17-13)6-14(12)18/h2-5,7,12,14,17H,6,8H2,1H3,(H,19,20)/t12-,14-/m1/s1; Key:RJNCJTROKRDRBW-TZMCWYRMSA-N

Paspalic acid, also known as δ^{8}-lysergic acid, is an alkaloid of the ergoline family found in large amounts in Claviceps paspali (ergot) growing on Paspalum dilatatum grass and also found in other related species. It is an isomer of lysergic acid, in which the double bond in the D ring of the ergoline ring system is between the 8 and 9 positions rather than between the 9 and 10 positions.

Elymoclavine is the biosynthetic precursor of paspalic acid in ergot and paspalic acid is an intermediate in the biosynthesis of lysergic acid. Paspalic acid contains the nucleus of some clavine alkaloids.

Paspalic acid is used industrially as a starting material in the chemical synthesis of lysergic acid and its derivatives as it very easily converts into lysergic acid under alkaline conditions. It has been a key precursor in the production of lysergic acid and derivatives since the 1960s.

Paspalic acid was first isolated and described by Kobel and colleagues at Sandoz in 1964. Its name was derived from its producers Claviceps paspali and Paspalum dilatatum.

== See also ==
- Substituted ergoline
- Lysergic acid
