= Lysergic acid =

Precursor for a range of ergoline alkaloids produced by the ergot fungus

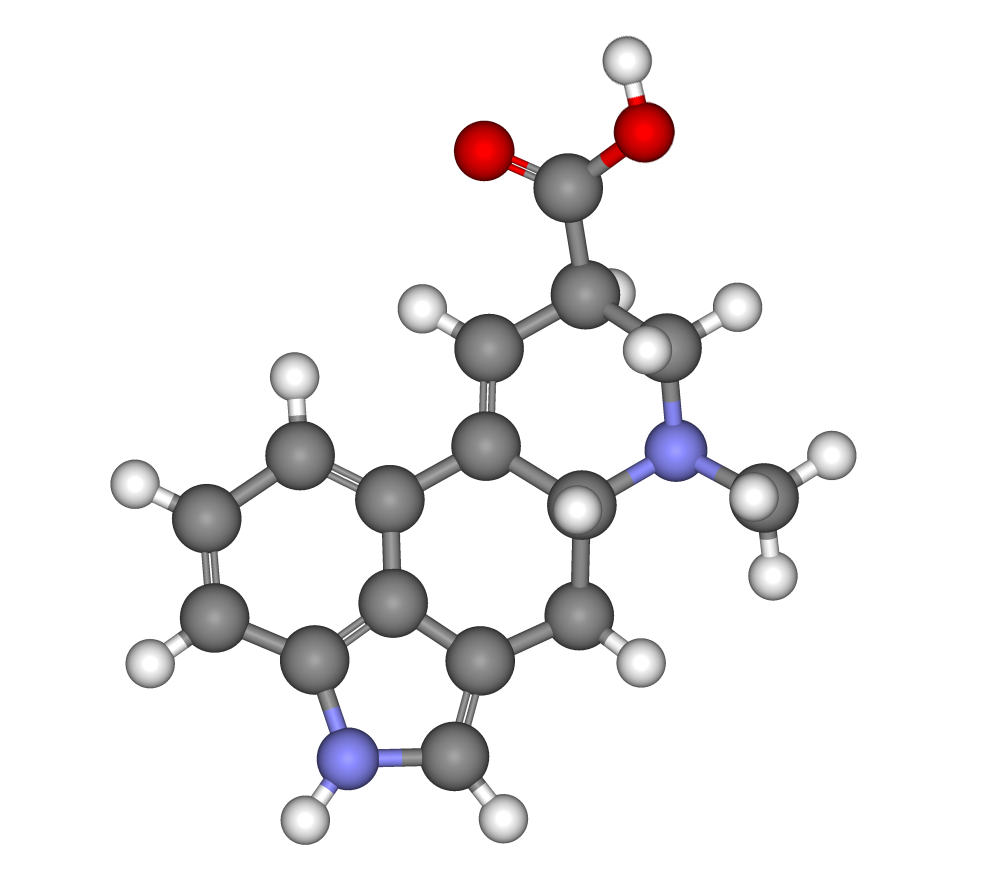

Names
- IUPAC name 6-Methyl-9,10-didehydroergoline-8β-carboxylic acid
- Systematic IUPAC name (5R,8R)-7-Methyl-4,6,6a,7,8,9-hexahydroindolo[4,3-fg]quinoline-9-carboxylic acid
- Other names Lysergate

Identifiers
CAS Number	82-58-6
3D model (JSmol)	Interactive image
ChEBI	CHEBI:6604
ChemSpider	6461
ECHA InfoCard	100.001.302
IUPHAR/BPS	139
PubChem CID	6717
UNII	ITO20DAO7J
CompTox Dashboard (EPA)	DTXSID60904515
- InChI: InChI=1S/C16H16N2O2/c1-18-8-10(16(19)20)5-12-11-3-2-4-13-15(11)9(7-17-13)6-14(12)18/h2-5,7,10,14,17H,6,8H2,1H3,(H,19,20)/t10-,14-/m1/s1 Key: ZAGRKAFMISFKIO-QMTHXVAHSA-N; InChI=1/C16H16N2O2/c1-18-8-10(16(19)20)5-12-11-3-2-4-13-15(11)9(7-17-13)6-14(12)18/h2-5,7,10,14,17H,6,8H2,1H3,(H,19,20)/t10-,14-/m1/s1 Key: ZAGRKAFMISFKIO-QMTHXVAHBD
- SMILES: CN1C[C@@H](C=C2[C@H]1CC3=CNC4=CC=CC2=C34)C(=O)O

Properties
Chemical formula	C_{16}H_{16}N_{2}O_{2}
Molar mass	268.316 g·mol^{−1}
Melting point	238 to 240 °C (460 to 464 °F; 511 to 513 K)
Acidity (pK_{a})	pK_{a1} = 7.80, pK_{a2} = 3.30
Legal status	BR: Class D1 (Drug precursors)
- Except where otherwise noted, data are given for materials in their standard state (at 25 °C [77 °F], 100 kPa). verify (what is ?) Infobox references

Lysergic acid, or lysergate, also known as D-lysergic acid and (+)-lysergic acid, is a precursor for a wide range of ergoline alkaloids that are produced by the ergot fungus and found in the seeds of Argyreia nervosa (Hawaiian baby woodrose), and Ipomoea species (morning glories, ololiuhqui, tlitliltzin).

Amides of lysergic acid, lysergamides, are widely used as pharmaceuticals and as psychedelic drugs, e.g. lysergic acid diethylamide (LSD). Lysergic acid is listed as a Table I precursor under the United Nations Convention Against Illicit Traffic in Narcotic Drugs and Psychotropic Substances.

The name "lysergic acid" comes from the fact that it is a carboxylic acid, and it was first made by hydrolysis of various ergot alkaloids.

== Pharmacology ==
Lysergic acid failed to produce LSD-like electroencephalogram (EEG) changes in rabbits.

== Chemistry ==
=== Synthesis ===
==== Laboratory ====
Lysergic acid is generally produced by hydrolysis of natural lysergamides, but can also be synthesized in the laboratory by a complex total synthesis, for example by Robert Burns Woodward's team in 1956. An enantioselective total synthesis based on a palladium-catalyzed domino cyclization reaction has been described in 2011 by Fujii and Ohno. Lysergic acid monohydrate crystallizes in very thin hexagonal leaflets when recrystallized from water. Lysergic acid monohydrate, when dried (140 °C at 2 mmHg or 270 Pa) forms anhydrous lysergic acid.

==== Biosynthesis ====
The biosynthetic route is based on the alkylation of the amino acid tryptophan with dimethylallyl diphosphate (isoprene derived from 3R-mevalonic acid) giving 4-dimethylallyl-L-tryptophan which is N-methylated with S-adenosyl-L-methionine. Oxidative ring closure followed by decarboxylation, reduction, cyclization, oxidation, and allylic isomerization yields D-(+)-lysergic acid. The biosynthetic pathway has been reconsituted in transgenic baker's yeast.

==== Illicit production ====
Lysergic acid manufactured by clandestine chemists (also known as cooks) to use in the illictic synthesis of LSD is produced using Ergotamine tartrate or Ergometrinine.

=== Isomers ===
Lysergic acid is a chiral compound with two stereocenters. The isomer with inverted configuration at carbon atom 8 close to the carboxyl group is called isolysergic acid. Inversion at carbon 5 close to the nitrogen atom leads to L-lysergic acid and L-isolysergic acid, respectively.

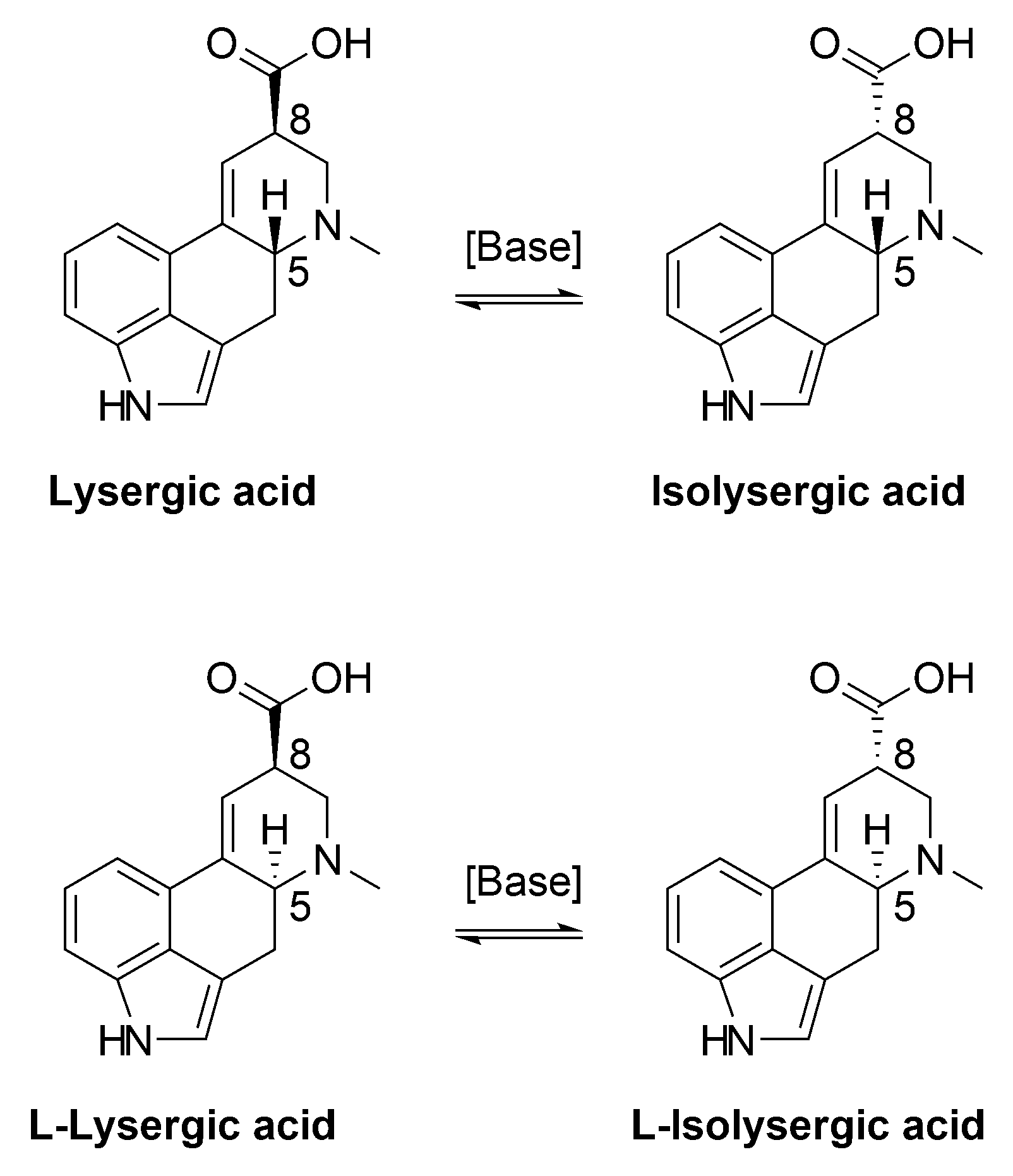
Chemical structures of lysergic acid isomers

== Society and culture ==
=== Legal status ===
==== Canada ====
Lysergic acid is a controlled substance in Canada.

==== United States ====
In the United States, lysergic acid and lysergic acid amide (LSA; ergine) are Schedule III substances.

== See also ==
- Ergine
- Lysergamides
- Paspalic acid
