= Spirit =

Spirit(s) commonly refers to:

- Liquor, a distilled alcoholic drink
- Spirit (animating force), the non-corporeal essence of living things
- Spirit (supernatural entity), an incorporeal or immaterial being

Spirit(s) may also refer to:

== Liquids ==
- Tincture, an extract of plant or animal material dissolved in ethanol
- Cologne spirit, also known as drinking alcohol
- Petroleum spirit (disambiguation)
  - Motor spirit, a clear petroleum-derived flammable liquid used primarily as a fuel
  - Petroleum ether, hydrocarbon mixtures used chiefly as non-polar solvents
  - White spirit or mineral spirits, a common organic solvent used in painting and decorating

== Philosophy, religion and folklore ==
- Spirituality, pertaining to the soul or spirit
- Holy Spirit, a divine force, manifestation of God in the Holy Trinity, or agent of divine action, according to Abrahamic Religions
- Great Spirit, conception of a supreme being prevalent among some Native American and First Nations cultures
- Vitalism, a belief in some fundamental, non-physical essence which differentiates organisms from inanimate, material objects
- Pneuma, an ancient Greek word sometimes translated as 'spirit'
- Soul, the spiritual part of a living being, often regarded as immortal
- Mind–body dualism, the view that mind and body are distinct and separable
- Geist, a German word corresponding to ghost, spirit, mind or intellect
- Psyche (psychology), a Greek word for 'soul' or 'spirit' used in psychology
- Genius (mythology), a Latin word for a divine spirit present in every individual person, place, or thing

== Mood ==
- Spirit, a mood, usually in reference to a good mood or optimism ("high spirits")
- Spirit, a feeling of social cohesiveness and mutual support, such as:
  - School spirit, a sense of a supportive community at an educational institution
  - Team spirit, such as that encouraged by team building activities

== Places ==
- Spirit (community), Wisconsin, an unincorporated US community
- Spirit, Wisconsin, a US town
- Spirit (building), a skyscraper on the Gold Coast in Queensland, Australia
- 37452 Spirit, an asteroid named after the Mars rover

== People and characters ==
- Spirit (media personality) (born 1975), American television and radio personality
- The Spirit (character), title character of the comic strip The Spirit by Will Eisner
- Spirit (G.I. Joe), a fictional character
- Spirit (She-Ra), a fictional character
- Spirit, a character from the Ōban Star-Racers animated television series

== Companies and brands ==
- SPIRIT Consortium, a group of vendors and users of electronic design automation tools
- Spirit (Belgium), a name for the Social Liberal Party, a Flemish left-liberal political party
- Spirit AeroSystems, an American manufacturer of structures for commercial airplanes
- Spirit Airlines, an American ultra-low-cost carrier that operated from 1992 to 2026
- Spirit of Atlanta Drum and Bugle Corps, based in Atlanta, Georgia
- Spirit DataCine, a device for digitization of motion picture film
- Spirit DSP, a company that develops software for voice and video communication
- Spirit Halloween, a seasonal retailer in the US
- Spirit Petroleum, an American brand created by the Petroleum Marketers Oil Corporation
- Spirit Pub Company, in the UK based in Burton upon Trent
- Spirit (Sirius), a Contemporary Christian music radio station

== Film and television ==
- Spirit (franchise), a media franchise
  - Spirit: Stallion of the Cimarron, a 2002 animated film that launched the franchise
- The Spirit (2008 film), a film based on the Eisner comic
- The Spirit (1987 film), an American made-for-television film based on the Eisner comic
- Spirit (2012 film), a Malayalam satirical comedy film
- Spirits (TV series), a 2004 Philippine fantasy series
  - Spirits Reawaken, a 2018 web series and remake of the 2004 show
- "Spirits" (Stargate SG-1), a television episode
- Spirit (2027 film), upcoming Indian film by Sandeep Reddy Vanga

== Music ==
=== Bands ===
- Spirit (band), an American 1960s and 1970s rock band
- Spirits (band), a 1995 male/female dance music duo from England

=== Albums ===
- Spirit (Spirit album), 1968
- Spirit (John Denver album), 1976
- Spirit (Earth, Wind & Fire album), 1976
- Spirit (Malachi Thompson album), 1983
- Spirit (Sean Maguire album), 1996
- Spirit (Willie Nelson album), 1996
- Spirit (Jewel album), 1998
- Spirit (Eluveitie album), 2006
- Spirit (J-Rocks album), 2007
- Spirit (Leona Lewis album), 2007
- Spirit (Hitomi album), 2011
- Spirit (Reckless Love album), 2013
- Spirit (Amos Lee album), 2016
- Spirit (Depeche Mode album), 2017
- Spirit (EP), by This Condition, 2010
- Spirit: Stallion of the Cimarron (soundtrack), 2002
- The Spirit (album), by Magnum, 1991
- Spirits (Albert Ayler album), 1966
- Spirits (Lee Konitz album), 1971
- Spirits (Keith Jarrett album), 1985
- Spirits (Gil Scott-Heron album), 1994
- Spirits (Misato Watanabe album), 1996
- Spirits (Pharoah Sanders album), 2000
- Spirits (Nothing More album), 2022
- Spirits (The Devil Makes Three album), 2025
- Spirit, 1995, by Caroline Lavelle
- Spirit, 2006, by Apse

=== Songs ===
- "Spirit" (Bauhaus song), 1982
- "Spirit" (Kwesta song), 2017
- "Spirit" (Beyoncé song), 2019
- "Spirits" (The Strumbellas song), 2015
- "Spirits" (Meja song), 2000
- "Spirit" by War from The Black-Man's Burdon, 1970
- "Spirit" by Van Morrison from Common One, 1980
- "Spirit" by Faith No More from Introduce Yourself, 1987
- "Spirit" by Phuture, 1994
- "Spirit" by Caesars from Paper Tigers, 2005
- "Spirit" by Ghost from Meliora, 2015
- "Spirit" by J Hus, 2017
- "Spirit!!" by Band-Maid from World Domination, 2018
- "Spirit" by the Killers from Rebel Diamonds, 2023

== Sports ==
- Washington Spirit, an American National Women's Soccer League team
- Spirit (gamer) (born 1996), South Korean esports player
- Spirit Racing, a 1980s auto racing team
- Team Spirit (esports), a Russian esports organization
- Susie Spirit, stage name of American female professional wrestler Laurie Thompson, one of The Cheerleaders from the Gorgeous Ladies of Wrestling

== Vehicles ==
- Advanced Soaring Concepts Spirit, a single-seat glider
- AMC Spirit, a subcompact automobile built from 1979 to 1983
- Northrop B-2 Spirit, a US Air Force stealth bomber
- Dodge Spirit, a mid-size car built from 1989 to 1995
- Spirit-class cruise ship, operated by Carnival Cruise Line and Costa Cruises
- Spirit (rover) (MER-A), one of two rovers in NASA's Mars Exploration Rover Mission
- World Aircraft Spirit, a Colombian/American light-sport aircraft

== Other uses ==
- Spirit (sculpture), a statue depicting John Denver by Sue DiCicco in Colorado, US
- Spirit: A Magazine of Poetry, a 20th-century poetry magazine published by the Catholic Poetry Society of America
- The Spirit (statue), a statue of Michael Jordan outside Chicago's United Center
- Spirit Parser Framework, an object-oriented parser-generator framework
- Spirit, an item introduced in Super Smash Bros. Ultimate

== See also ==
- The Spirit (disambiguation)
- Spirited, a 2010 Australian TV drama series
- Spirit FM (disambiguation)
- Spirited (film), an American Christmas musical film
- Spiritual (disambiguation)
- Spiritus (disambiguation)
- Sprite (disambiguation)
- Sprit, other name for Spritsail
