= Aztec use of entheogens =

Entheogenic use by ancient Aztecs

The ancient Aztecs employed a variety of entheogenic plants and animals within their society. The various species have been identified through their depiction on murals, vases, and other objects.

== History ==
There is substantial archaeological evidence for the use of entheogens in early Mesoamerica. Olmec burial sites with remains of the cane toad (Bufo marinus), Maya mushroom effigies, and Spanish writings all point to a heavy involvement with psychoactive substances in the Aztec lifestyle.

The Florentine codex contains multiple references to the use of psychoactive plants among the Aztecs. The 11th book of the series identifies five plant entheogens. R. Gordon Wasson, Richard Evans Schultes, and Albert Hofmann have suggested that the statue of Xochipilli, the Aztec 'Prince of Flowers,' contains effigies of several plant-based entheogens.

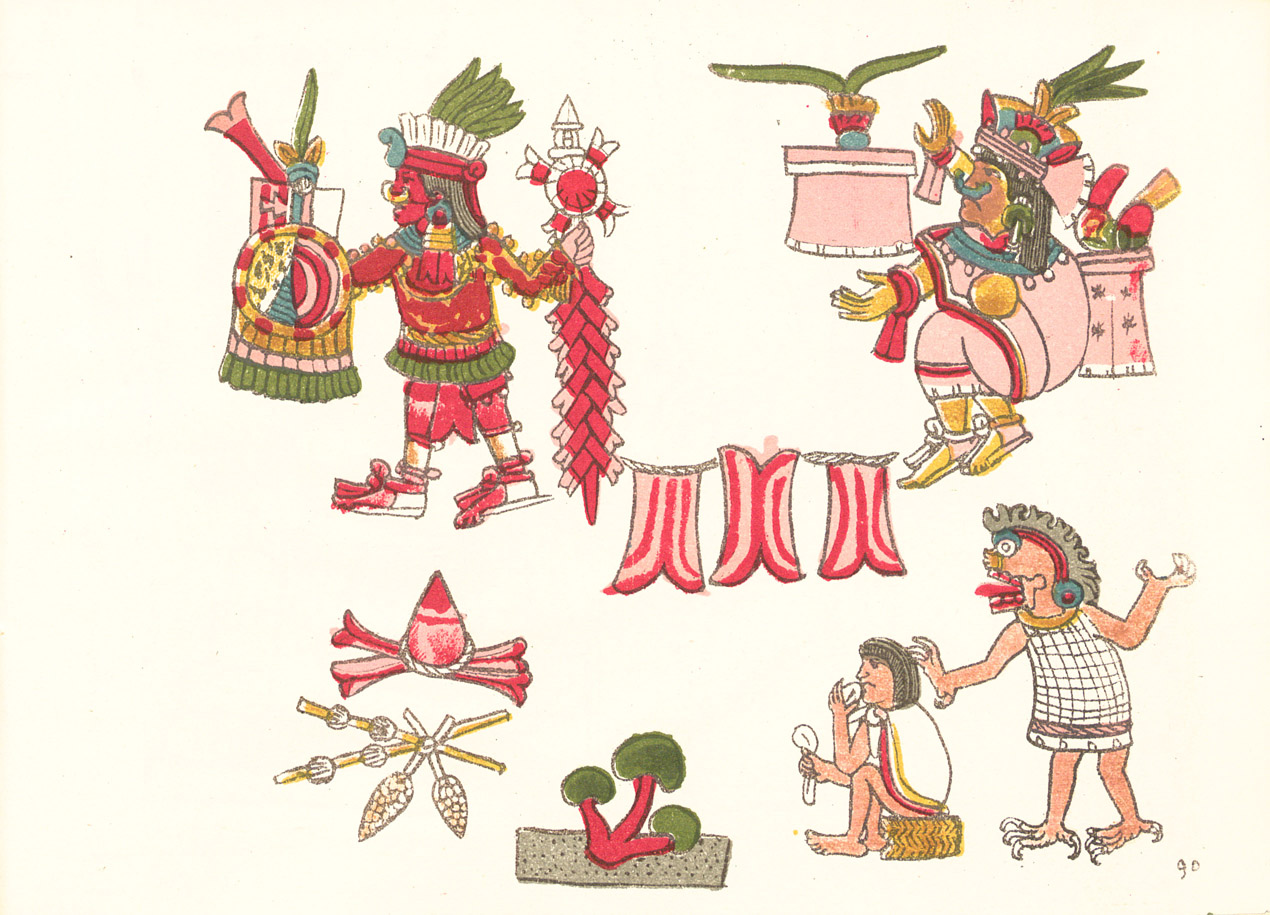
Folio 90r of the Codex Magliabechiano, depiction of Psilocybin Mushroom usage in the bottom right, with the user being visited by a spirit of some kind.

The plants were primarily used by the tlamacazqueh (priests; singular, tlamacazqui), other nobility, and visiting dignitaries. They would use them for divination much as the indigenous groups of Central Mexico do today. The tlamacazqueh would also ingest the entheogens to engage in prophecy, interpret visions, and heal.

== Entheogens ==
=== Ololiuqui and tlitliltzin ===
Ololiuqui (Coatl xoxouhqui, Christmasvine, snakeplant) was identified as Ipomoea corymbosa in 1941 by Richard Evans Schultes. The name ololiuqui refers to the brown seeds of the I. corymbosa plant. Tlitliltzin was identified later as being Ipomoea tricolor by R. Gordon Wasson. This variety has black seeds and typically has bluish flowers.

The seeds of these plants contain the psychoactive lysergamides ergine (lysergic acid amide; LSA) and isoergine (isolysergic acid amide; iso-LSA), which are closely structurally related to lysergic acid diethylamide (LSD). The preparation of the seeds involved grinding them on a metate, then filtering them with water to extract the alkaloids. The resulting brew was then consumed to elicit visions.

The Florentine Codex, 11 describes ololiuqui intoxication:

It makes one besotted; it deranges one, troubles one, maddens one, makes one possessed. He who eats it, who drinks it, sees many things which greatly terrify him. He is really frightened [by the] poisonous serpent which he sees for that reason.

Ololiuqui was also utilized in healing rituals by the ticitl, or healer. The ticitl would often take ololiuqui to determine the cause of a disease. It was also used as an anesthetic to relieve pain by preparing a paste from the seeds and tobacco leaves, then rubbing it on the affected body part.

=== Mushrooms ===
Called "Teunanacatl" "divine mushroom" in Nahuatl, with teo(tl) referring to the divine and nanacatl meaning "mushroom". The name is mistranslated as "flesh of the gods", as the word for flesh, nacatl, is very similar to the word for mushroom. The mushroom genus Psilocybe has a long history of use within Mesoamerica. The members of the Aztec nobility would often take Teonanacatl at festivals and other large gatherings. According to Fernando Alvarado Tezozomoc, it was often a difficult task to procure mushrooms. They were both costly and difficult to locate, necessitating all-night searches.

Both Bernardino de Sahagún and Toribio de Benavente Motolinia describe the use of the mushrooms. The Aztecs would drink chocolate and eat the mushrooms with honey. Those partaking in the mushroom ceremonies would fast before ingesting the sacrament. The act of taking mushrooms is known as monanacahuia, meaning to "mushroom oneself".

Some written observations, influenced by Catholic doctrine, recount the use of the mushroom among the court of Moctezuma I. Allegedly, during his coronation, many prisoners were sacrificed, had their flesh eaten, and their hearts removed. Those who were guests to the feast ate mushrooms, which Diego Durán describes as causing those who ate them to go insane. After the Spanish conquest of the Aztec Empire, the Spanish forbade traditional religious practices and rituals that they considered "pagan idolatry", including ceremonial mushroom use.

=== Sinicuichi ===
Not much is known of the use of Heimia salicifolia, called sinicuichi (alternate spelling sinicuiche) among the Aztecs. R. Gordon Wasson identified the flower on the statue of Xochipilli and, from its placement alongside other entheogens, suggested that it was probably used in a ritual context. Multiple alkaloids have been isolated from the plant, with cryogenine, lythrine, and nesodine being the most important.

Sinicuichi could be the plant tonatiuh yxiuh "the herb of the sun" from the Libellus de Medicinalibus Indorum Herbis. tonatiuh means sun. In Central and South America, sinicuichi is now often called abre-o-sol, "sun opener." Tonatiuh yxiuh is described as being a summer-blooming plant, as is Heimia.

The Libellus de Medicinalibus Indorum Herbis also includes a recipe for a potion to conquer fear. It reads, "Let one who is fear-burdened take as a drink a potion made of the herb tonatiuh yxiuh, which throws out the brightness of gold."

One of the effects of sinicuichi is that it adds a golden halo or tinge to objects when ingested.

=== Tlapatl and Mixitl ===
Tlapatl and mixitl are Datura stramonium and Datura innoxia, with strong deliriant properties. The plants typically have large, white or purplish, trumpet-shaped flowers and spiny seed capsules, that of D. stramonium being held erect and dehisceing by four valves, and that of D. innoxia nodding downward and breaking up irregularly. The active principles are the tropane alkaloids atropine, scopolamine, and hyoscyamine.

The use of datura spans millennia. Many indigenous groups in the Americas have employed it for various purposes. Called toloache today in Mexico, datura species were used among the Aztecs for medicine, divination, and malevolent purposes.

For healing, tlapatl was made into an ointment, which was applied to infected areas to treat gout, and also used as a local anesthetic. The plants were also used to harm others. For example, it was believed that mixitl would cause a being to become paralyzed and mute, while tlapatl would cause those who take it to be disturbed and go mad.

=== Peyotl ===
The cactus known as peyotl, or more commonly peyote (Lophophora williamsii), has a rich history of use in Mesoamerica. Its use in northern Mexico among the Huichol has been written about extensively. It is thought that, because peyote grows only in some areas of Mexico, the Aztecs would obtain dried buttons through long-distance trade. Peyote was viewed as being a protective plant by the Aztec. Sahagún suggested that the plant enabled the Aztec warriors to fight as they did.

=== Pipiltzintzintli ===
R. Gordon Wasson has posited that the plant known as pipiltzintzintli is in fact Salvia divinorum. It is not entirely known whether or not the Aztecs used this plant as a psychotropic, but Jonathan Ott (1996) argues that although there are competing species for the identification of pipiltzintzintli, Salvia divinorum is probably the "best bet." There are references to use of pipiltzintzintli in Spanish arrest records from the conquest, as well as a reference to the mixing of ololiuqui with pipiltzintzintli.

Contemporaneously, the Mazatec, meaning "people of the deer" in Nahuatl, from the Oaxaca region of Mexico utilize Salvia divinorum when Psilocybe mushrooms are not readily available. They chew and swallow the leaves of fresh salvia to enter into a shamanic state of consciousness. The Mazatec use the plant in both divination and healing ceremonies, perhaps as the Aztecs did 500 years ago. Modern users of Salvia have adapted the traditional method, forgoing the ingestion of juices because Salvinorin A is readily absorbed by the mucous membranes of the mouth.

=== Toloatzin ===
Toloatzin refers to D. innoxia specifically, although it is often confused with D. stramonium in general.

== Combinations ==
=== Cacahua ===
Aztecs combined cacao with psilocybin mushrooms, a polysubstance combination referred to as "cacahua-xochitl", which literally means "chocolate-flowers".

At the very first, mushrooms had been served...They ate no more food; they only drank chocolate during the night. And they ate the mushrooms with honey. When the mushrooms took effect on them, then they danced, then they wept. But some, while still in command of their senses, entered and sat there by the house on their seats; they did no more, but only sat there nodding.

=== Teotlaqualli ===
Teotlaqualli was a combination of ololiuhqui, picietl, and the ashes of poisonous animals that was used by the Aztecs.

== See also ==
- Calea ternifolia
- Entheogenic drugs and the archaeological record
- Entheogenics and the Maya
- List of Acacia species known to contain psychoactive alkaloids
- List of plants used for smoking
- List of psychoactive plants
- List of psychoactive plants, fungi, and animals
- Dimethyltryptamine (DMT)
- Psilocybin mushrooms
- Psychoactive cacti

== Sources ==
- De Rios, Marlene Dobkin. "Hallucinogens, cross-cultural perspectives." University of New Mexico Press. Albuquerque, New Mexico, 1984.
- Dibble, Charles E., et al. (trans). "Florentine Codex: Book 9." The University of Utah. Utah, 1959.
- Dibble, Charles E., et al. (trans). "Florentine Codex: Book 11 - Earthly Things." The School of American Research. Santa Fe, New Mexico, 1963.
- Elferink, Jan G. R., Flores, Jose A., Kaplan Charles D. "The Use of Plants and Other Natural Products for Malevolent Practices Among the Aztecs and Their Successors." Estudios de Cultura Nahuatl Volume 24, 1994.
- Furst, Peter T. "Flesh of the Gods: The Ritual Use of Hallucinogens." Waveland Press, Prospect Heights, Illinois, 1972.
- Gates, William. "The De La Cruz-Badiano Aztec Herbal of 1552." The Maya Society. Baltimore, Maryland, 1939.
- Hofmann, Albert. "Teonanácatl and Ololiuqui, two ancient magic drugs of Mexico." UNODC Bulletin on Narcotics. Issue 1, pp. 3–14, 1971.
- Ott, Jonathan. "On Salvia divinorum" Eleusis, n. 4, pp. 31–39, April 1996.
- Schultes, Richard Evans. "The Plant Kingdom and the Hallucinogens." UNODC Bulletin on Narcotics. Issue 4, 1969.
- Steck, Francis Borgia. "Motolinia's History of the Indians of New Spain." William Byrd Press, Inc. Richmond, Virginia, 1951.
- Townsend, Richard F. "The Aztecs." Thames & Hudson Inc. New York, New York, 2000.
- Lyncho Ruiz 1996 Balancing Act Research and Education Founder, President, Ecosystem Management Director and Ethnobotanist
