= RAF Benevolent Fund =

British veterans' organisation

- The Royal Air Force Benevolent Fund
- RAF Benevolent Fund 'Heart Roundel' Logo
- Established: 1919; 107 years ago
- Founder: Hugh Trenchard, 1st Viscount Trenchard
- Type: Non-profit
- Legal status: Charity
- Chief Executive: Chris Elliot
- Patron president: The Duke of Kent
- Website: www.rafbf.org

The Royal Air Force Benevolent Fund provides lifelong support to serving and ex-serving RAF personnel and their families. It supports current and former members of the RAF, their partners and families, providing practical, emotional and financial support, whenever it is needed. The Fund is committed to getting members of the RAF Family through the toughest times, whatever life may send their way.

The Fund will consider any request for assistance, however big or small, providing a tailor-made approach to each individual situation. The RAF Benevolent Fund is unique in providing a range of support for serving RAF and their dependents, from support with childcare and relationship difficulties to help with retraining, injury, disability, illness and bereavement.

For former serving RAF members and their partners, the Fund offers financial grants to aid day-to-day living, cover one-off unexpected costs for practical items like a new fridge or replace a broken boiler, right through to renovating homes to help people live independently. The Fund can provide respite care, bereavement support or arrange telephone groups to help those isolated or lonely.

The RAF Benevolent Fund is also the official guardian of the Bomber Command Memorial in Green Park, London.

== History ==
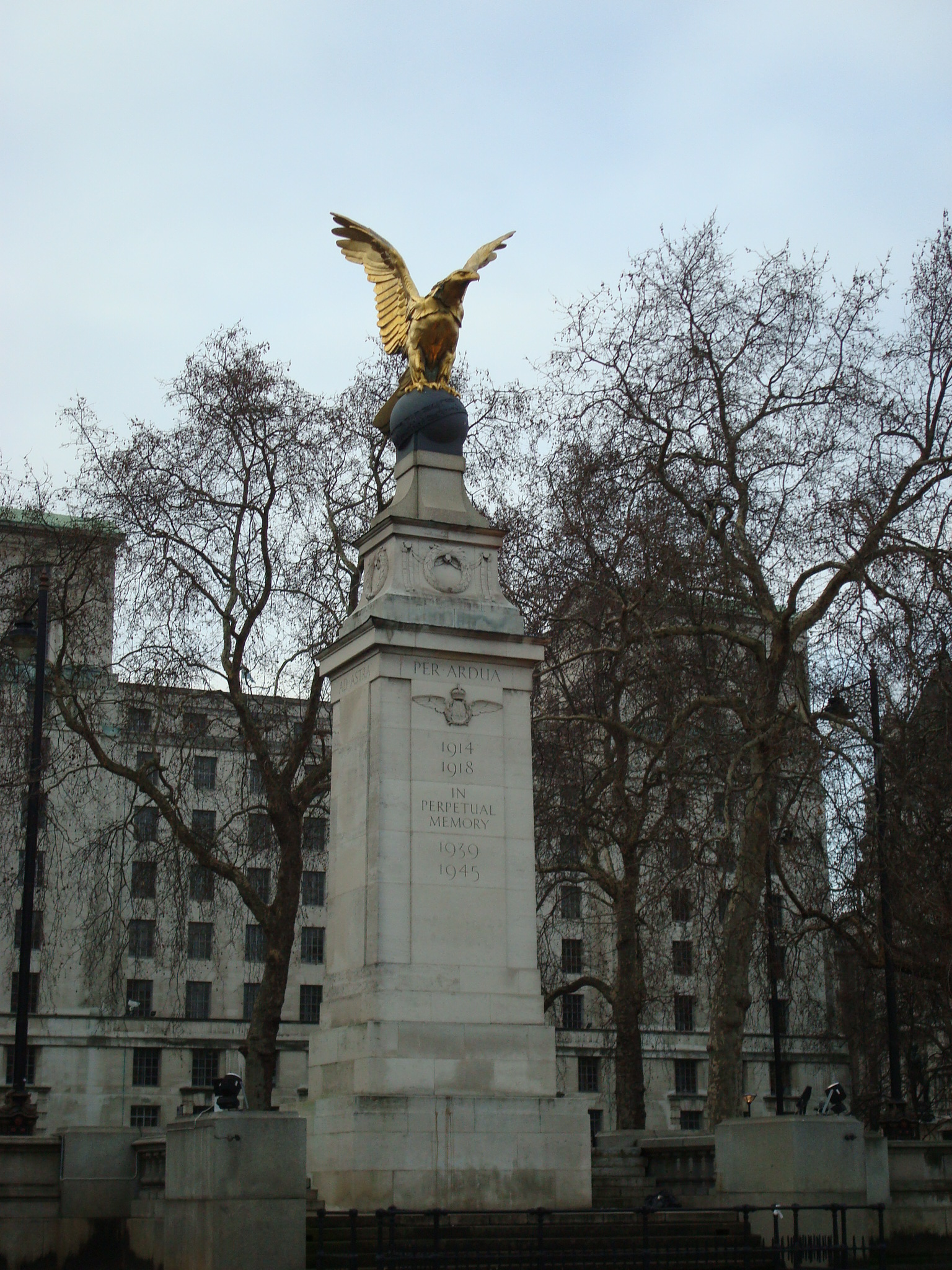
The Royal Air Force Memorial in London

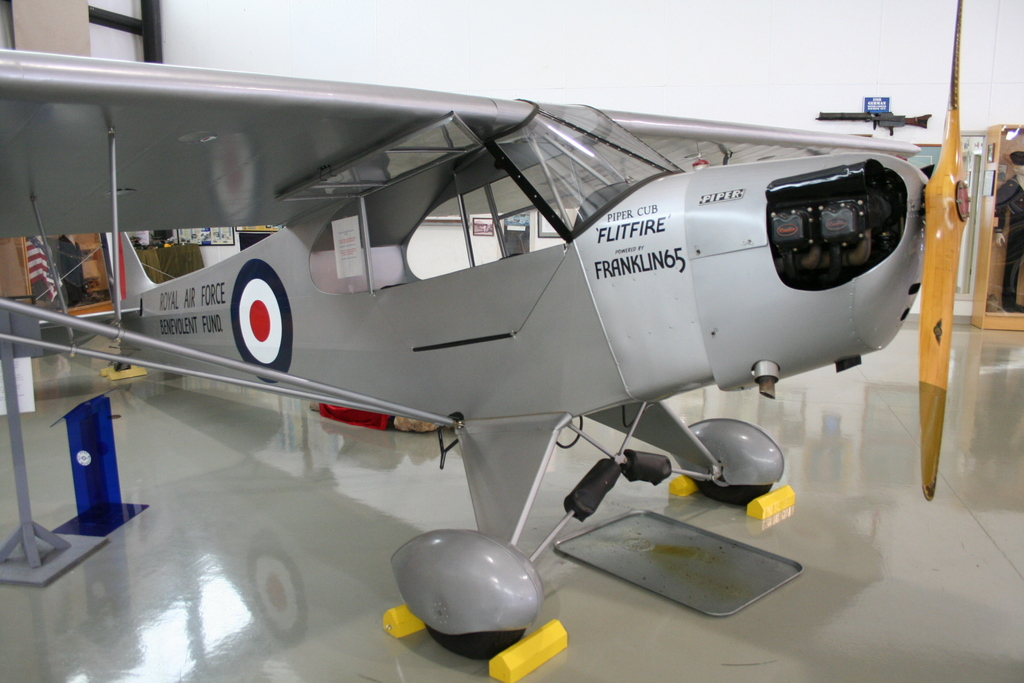
Piper J-3 Flitfire, auctioned for the RAFBF (visible on the tail section), on display at the North Carolina Aviation Museum

Lord Trenchard founded the Royal Air Force Benevolent Fund in 1919, one year after the formation of the Royal Air Force. In its first year, welfare expenditure was £919. The first welfare assistance the RAF Benevolent Fund gave was a shilling for a night's lodging to give the recipient a chance to seek work. Other early assistance included money to provide a beneficiary with tools of his trade and the repair of a pair of working boots. In 2010 the Fund spent over £23 million on welfare provision.

The Royal Air Force Benevolent Fund was originally known as the Royal Air Force Memorial Fund as one of their charitable objects was to raise a memorial to airmen who died in the First World War. The Royal Air Force Memorial was completed in 1923. The monument, in Portland stone surmounted by a gilded eagle, can be seen on Victoria Embankment.

Fundraising for the RAF Benevolent Fund occurred outside the UK as well. Prior to the United States entering World War II, Piper Aircraft Company produced 49, one for each state in the US plus another, Piper J-3 aircraft with RAF insignia and nicknamed the Flitfire, to be auctioned to benefit the Fund. On 29 April 1941 all 48 aircraft flew into La Guardia Field for a dedication and fundraising event which included Royal Navy officers from the battleship HMS Malaya, in New York for repairs, as honored guests.

The RAF Benevolent Fund was awarded a Royal Charter in 1999 and this was updated in 2008 by the addition of a new charitable object to permit them to work towards supporting the morale and well-being of the serving RAF.

== See also ==
- SSAFA Forces Help
- Royal Air Forces Association
- The Royal British Legion
- Guinea Pig Club
