= Sprite =

Sprite commonly refers to:

- Sprite (computer graphics), a smaller bitmap composited onto another by hardware or software
- Sprite (drink), a lemon-lime beverage produced by the Coca-Cola Company
- Sprite (folklore), a type of legendary creature including elves, fairies, and pixies

Sprite may also refer to:

== Comics ==
- Sprite (Eternal), a fictional member of the race of Eternals in the Marvel Universe
- Sprite (manga), a 2009 Japanese manga series
- Sprite, alias of the Marvel Comics character Kitty Pryde
- Sprite (Marvel Comics), alias of the Marvel Comics character Jia Jing
- Sprite comic, a webcomic that consists primarily of computer sprites from video games

== Computing and technology ==
- Sprite (computer graphics), an image integrated into a larger scene
- Sprite (operating system), an operating system developed at the University of California, Berkeley
- SPRITE (spacecraft), a proposed Saturn atmospheric probe mission
- SPRITE infrared detector, a specialist detector device using a process known as signal processing in the element
- De Havilland Sprite, a British rocket engine

== Vehicles ==
- Sprite (motorcycle), a historical British make of motorcycle
- Sprite-class tanker, a class of spirit tankers of the Royal Fleet Auxiliary
- Austin-Healey Sprite, a British car
- Austin-Healey Sebring Sprite, a modification
- Practavia Sprite, a British two-seat home-built training or touring aircraft
- Schweizer SGS 1-36 Sprite, an American sailplane design

== Zoology ==
- Sprite butterflies, certain skipper butterfly genera in subfamily Pyrginae, tribe Celaenorrhinini:
  - Celaenorrhinus (typical sprites)
  - Katreus (giant scarce sprite)
  - Loxolexis (scarce sprites)
- Sedge sprite, a species of damselfly in the family Coenagrionidae
- Sprite possum, an extinct marsupial

== Other ==
- Sprite (lightning), a weather phenomenon.
- Sprites (band), from the U.S.
- Sukalawat Phuangsombat, also known as SPRITE, a Thai rapper
- "Sprite", a song by Beat Crusaders on the album Sexcite!
- Sprite melon, a type of sweet melon cultivated in North Carolina
- Sprite (Dungeons & Dragons)
- Sprites Ward, Ipswich, Suffolk, England
- Water sprite, the freshwater fern Ceratopteris thalictroides

== See also ==
- Sea Sprite (disambiguation)
- Spirit (disambiguation)
- Sprit, other name for Spritsail
