= Rippershausen =

Municipality in Thuringia, Germany

- Municipality
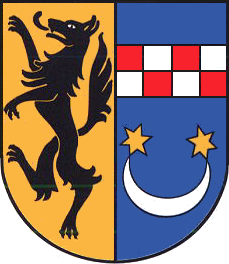
- Coat of arms

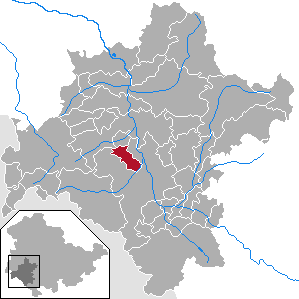
- Location of Rippershausen within Schmalkalden-Meiningen district
- Interactive map of Rippershausen
- Location within Germany Location within Thuringia
- Coordinates: 50°36′N 10°20′E
- Country: Germany
- State: Thuringia
- District: Schmalkalden-Meiningen
- Subdivisions: 2

Government
  - Mayor (2019–25): Frank Bandemer

Area
  - Total: 11.49 km^{2} (4.44 sq mi)
- Elevation: 335 m (1,099 ft)

Population (2025-12-31)
  - Total: 780
  - Density: 68/km^{2} (180/sq mi)
- Time zone: UTC+01:00 (CET)
  - Summer (DST): UTC+02:00 (CEST)
- Postal codes: 98639
- Dialling codes: 03693
- Vehicle registration: SM

Rippershausen is a municipality in the district Schmalkalden-Meiningen, in Thuringia, Germany.

== Notable people ==
- Ernst Ludwig Heim
