= Spiritual =

Spiritual is the adjective for the noun "spirit" (animating force or supernatural entity).

Spiritual may also refer to:

== Religion ==
- Spirituality, the quality or state of being spiritual, traditionally referring to a religious process of re-formation that "aims to recover the original shape of man"
  - Spiritual activism, a practice that brings together the otherworldly and inward-focused work of spirituality and the worldly and outwardly-focused work of activism
  - Spiritual attack, an attack by Satan and his demons on a Christian
  - Spiritual body, a Christian concept
  - Spiritual but not religious, a religious classification
  - Spiritual bypass, a tendency to use spiritual ideas and practices to sidestep or avoid facing unresolved emotional issues, psychological wounds, and unfinished developmental tasks
  - Spiritual communion, a Christian practice of desiring union with Jesus Christ in the Eucharist
  - Spiritual crisis, a form of identity crisis where an individual experiences drastic changes to their meaning system typically because of a spontaneous spiritual experience
  - Spiritual death, a religious concept
  - Spiritual development, the development of the personality towards a religious or spiritual desired better personality
  - Spiritual direction, the practice of being with people as they attempt to deepen their relationship with the divine, or to learn and grow in their personal spirituality
  - Spiritual distress, a disturbance in a person's belief system
  - Spiritual ecology, a field in religion and environmentalism
  - Spiritual energy, a form of energy in spirituality and alternative medicine
  - Spiritual evolution, the idea that the mind or spirit evolves from a simple form dominated by nature, to a higher form dominated by the spiritual or divine
  - Spiritual experience, a subjective experience that is interpreted within a religious framework
  - Spiritual formation, the process and practices by which a person may progress in one's spiritual or religious life or to a movement in Protestantism
  - Spiritual gift, a supernatural power given by the Holy Spirit
  - Spiritual guide, an entity that remains as a discarnate spirit to act as a guide or protector to a living incarnated individual
  - Spiritual healing, a form of alternative medicine
  - Spiritual intelligence, a term used by some philosophers, psychologists, and developmental theorists to indicate spiritual parallels with intelligence quotient and emotional quotient
  - Spiritual literature, a genre of literature that usually involves the personal spiritual experience of the author
  - Spiritual mapping, a Christian belief that specific demons, known as territorial spirits, are associated with specific locations and can be conquered through strategic spiritual warfare by plotting out geographical areas and their perceived problems in order to pray on-site
  - Spiritual materialism, a Tibetan Buddhist concept
  - Spiritual naturalism, the combination of philosophical naturalism and spirituality
  - Spiritual opportunism, the exploitation of spiritual ideas for personal gain, partisan interests or selfish motives
  - Spiritual philosophy, a philosophy pertaining to spirituality
  - Spiritual possession, the purported control of a human body by spirits
  - Spiritual practice, the performance of actions and activities undertaken for the purpose of inducing spiritual experiences and cultivating spiritual development
  - Spiritual psychology, a psychological school that integrates the spiritual and transcendent aspects of the human experience within the framework of modern psychology
  - Spiritual reading, a practice of reading books and articles about spirituality with the purpose of growing in holiness
  - Spiritual retreat, a period of meditation, prayer or study
  - Spiritual test, a life situation, provided by God, to evaluate man's individual moral character and obedience to his laws
  - Spiritual transformation, a fundamental change in a person's sacred or spiritual life
  - Spiritual vision, something seen in a dream, trance, or religious ecstasy, especially a supernatural appearance that usually conveys a revelation
  - Spiritual warfare, the Christian concept of fighting against the work of preternatural evil forces
  - Spiritual warrior, a Tibetan Buddhist term for one who combats avidyā ("ignorance")
- Lords Spiritual, the bishops of the Church of England who sit in the House of Lords of the United Kingdom
- Spiritual Baptist, an Afro-American religion and Christian new religious movement
- Spiritual Christianity, a Russian Christian new religious movement
- Spiritual church movement, an African-American group of Spiritualist churches and denominations
- Spiritual Franciscans, a Franciscan order
- Spiritual Israelite, a member of the Assemblies of Yahweh in Bethel, Pennsylvania

== Music ==
- Spirituals, a genre of Christian music that is associated with African Americans
- Spirituals (David Murray album), 1988
- Spirituals (Paul Robeson album), 1946
- Spirituals (Santigold album), 2022
- The Spiritual, a 1969 album by the Art Ensemble of Chicago
- "Spiritual", a song by Katy Perry from her 2013 album Prism

== Other uses ==
- Spiritual successor, a product or fictional work that is similar to, or directly inspired by, another previous product or work, but does not explicitly continue the product line or media franchise of its predecessor

== See also ==
- Spirit (disambiguation)
