= Ernst Ludwig Heim =

German physician and naturalist (1747–1834)

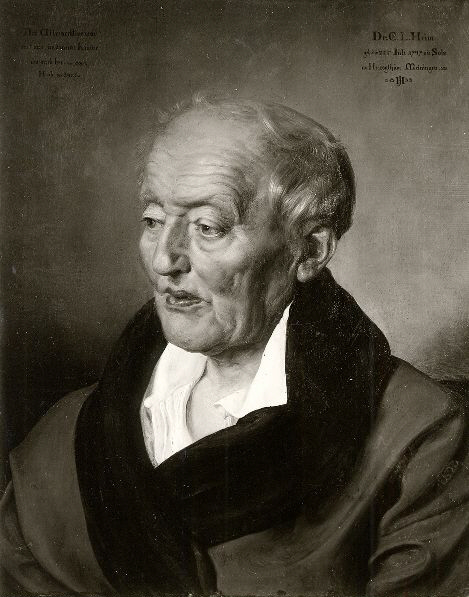
Ernst Ludwig Heim, painting by Julius Hübner.

Ernst Ludwig Heim (22 July 1747 – 15 September 1834) was a German medical doctor and naturalist born in Solz, Thuringia. He was popular for providing free medical treatment in Berlin. As a naturalist Heim influenced Alexander von Humboldt and Christian Konrad Sprengel.

== Early life ==
Heim was the son of pastor Johann Ludwig Heim (1704–1785). He went to Halle to study in 1766 and received his doctorate in 1772. He studied medicine, botany, astronomy, natural law and philosophy. He then served as Stadtphysikus (city physician) in Spandau (1776). He travelled across the Netherlands, France and England and visited hospitals and examined public health. Heim married Charlotte Maeker in 1780 and in April 1783 they moved to Berlin with their young daughter and lived at the Gendarmenmarkt. He opened a practice in Markgrafenstraße where he had a system of treating poor patients for free in the early morning. In 1799 he introduced smallpox vaccination in Berlin using cowpox inoculation based on Edward Jenner's work. He was an expert in the diagnosis of diseases and introduced novel methods including using colour and smell to identify diseases. In 1822, in recognition of decades of altruistic service, and on the 50th anniversary of earning his doctorate, Heim was made an honorary citizen of Berlin. In Germany, numerous landmarks bear his name, and he is commemorated on a 1984 postage stamp. In addition, over sixteen biographies on Heim have been published. Heim was the physician who tried to treat Luise of Mecklenburg-Strelitz (Queen Luise of Prussia) but failed to prevent her death. He was for a period of time was a teacher to 8-year old Alexander von Humboldt in Tegel. He visited on horseback and gave instructions in botany, explaining the twenty-four Linnean classes. They also went out on botanical excursions with Carl Sigismund Kunth. He also influenced the Christian Konrad Sprengel who came to him for treatment. Sprengel took to botany thanks to Heim's suggestion that he needed to spend more time outdoors. The plant genus Heimia is named in his honor.

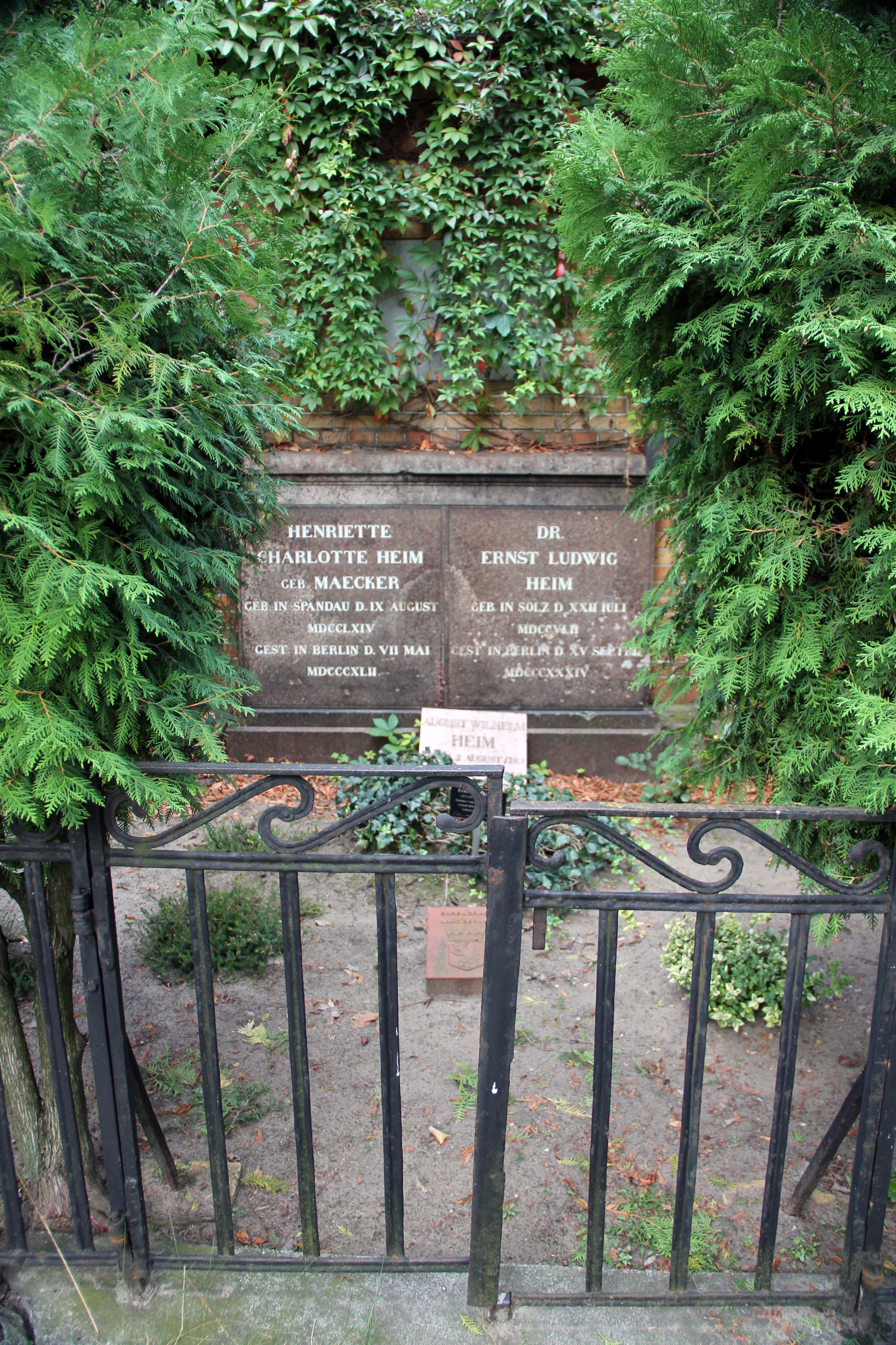
Grave of Heim (52°29′41″N 13°23′21″E)

Heim died on 15 September 1834 in his bed and Berliners escorted the carriage of his body to the cemetery at Halleschen gate in large numbers. A family grave is marked for his wife and him.
