= In the Spirit =

In the Spirit may refer to:

- In the Spirit (film), a 1990 American film
- In the Spirit (Joe McPhee album), 1999
- In the Spirit (Stella Parton album), 2008

== See also ==
- The Spirit (disambiguation)
