= Spirit FM =

Spirit FM may refer to:

- Spirit FM (UK radio station), a radio station in West Sussex, United Kingdom
- Spirit FM (Missouri), a network of Christian radio stations in Missouri, United States
- Spirit FM, a network of Christian radio stations in Virginia and West Virginia, United States, which includes WPAR
- Spirit FM, a network of Christian radio stations of the Catholic Media Network in the Philippines
- Spirit FM (Narrandera), a community radio station broadcasting from Narrandera, Australia
- WBVM, 90.5 FM, a Christian radio station in Tampa, Florida, United States branded Spirit FM
