= Piper Flitfire =

Special edition of the Piper J-3 Cub

Flitfire Cub
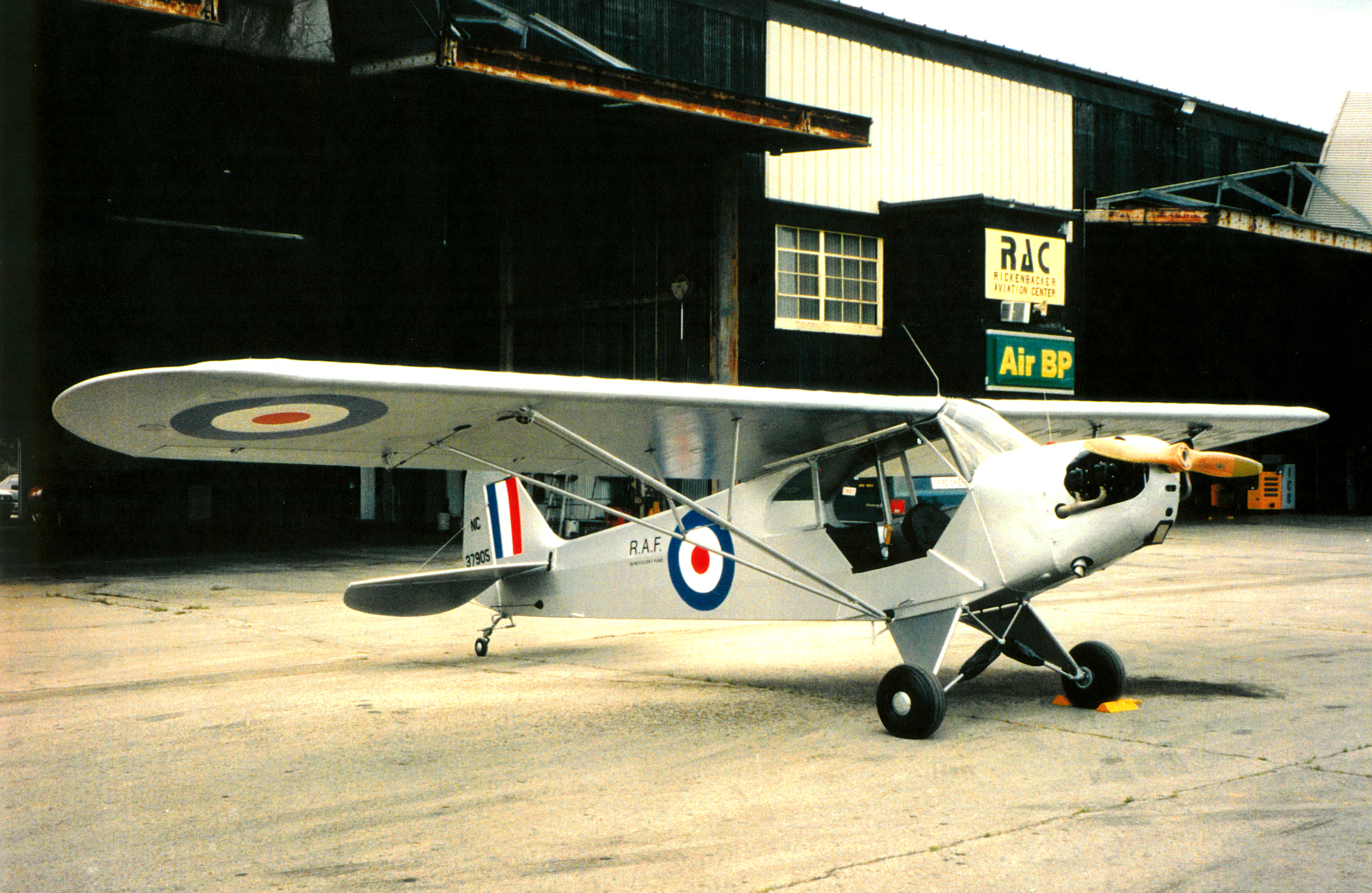
- "Flitfire Wisconsin" Rickenbacker Airport; Columbus Ohio, July 1991

General information
- Type: Multipurpose light civil aircraft
- Manufacturer: Piper Aircraft
- Number built: 51 (Note: Factory records indicate that 51 aircraft were built. However, multiple publications of the time claim that only 48 actually flew to New York City.)

History
- Manufactured: 10 – 22 April 1941
- First flight: 27 April 1941

The Flitfire is a special edition of the Piper J-3 Cub that was used to raise funds to support the British war effort in World War II. The name "Flitfire" is a play on words referring to the RAF's most well-known fighter, the Supermarine Spitfire, which was and is a symbol of British resistance during the Battle of Britain.

In April 1941, prior to the United States' entry into World War II, Piper Aircraft and its distributors donated special edition Piper J-3 Cubs as a publicity event and a fundraiser for the Royal Air Force Benevolent Fund. These donated Cubs — painted with Royal Air Force insignia — were known as "Flitfires."

This fund raising program consisted of 49 Flitfire aircraft, one paid for by Piper Aircraft and 48 by Piper distributors. All were built by Piper. There was a Flitfire named for each of the 48 states in the union at that time. These airplanes were colloquially known as "The Flitfire Brigade."

== Conception ==
During the Battle of Britain (10 July - 31 October 1940) the Royal Air Force (RAF) suffered heavy casualties, losing 1,420 members: 520 in Fighter Command, 700 in Bomber Command and 200 in Coastal Command. The Royal Air Force Benevolent Fund (RAFBF), an independent charity established post World War I to support RAF casualties and their families, worked to provide welfare to the RAF and families who were affected in the new conflict.

The RAFBF was supported by a light aircraft manufacturer in the United States, Piper Aircraft Corporation of Lock Haven, Pennsylvania. As an expression of encouragement to the RAF, Piper's President William T. Piper decided to donate a single Piper J-3 Cub as a grand national prize, with all proceeds going to the RAFBF. At the start of April 1941, Bill Strohmeier, Piper’s Sales and Promotion Manager, then encouraged Piper dealers across the country to order further ones for their own use. The special silver finish with RAF-style insignia was included at no additional cost to the dealers. Strohmeier requested the 48 U.S. Piper dealers to donate one Cub, which would represent the state of their choice. (Note: However, there was not a Piper dealer in all 48 states, as some states had more than one dealer and others had none.) For every donation, Piper set aside 20 minutes of manufacturing time, which was sufficient to build one aircraft. A total of 49 Cubs were donated to support the fund raiser, one named for each of the 48 states, plus William Piper's initial donation registered as NC1776. All funds collected went to the RAFBF and none went toward expenses.

== Silver Cub with RAF insignia ==
The first Flitfire, NC1776, a J3F-65, serial number 6600, was powered by a Franklin 65 hp (48 kW) engine that was donated by the manufacturer Air Cooled Motors Corporation. The Civil Aeronautics Administration assigned registration number NC1776 to this aircraft, symbolizing the Benevolent Fund's aid to Britain in the same manner as the Lend Lease Act, which had Congressional number HR1776. The March 1941 Lend Lease Act was the principal vehicle for the U.S. to provide military aid to foreign nations before its entry in World War II.

The other forty-eight Cubs had one of three engines: Continental, Lycoming or Franklin. To honor the RAF, instead of the signature yellow Cub color, the Flitfire airplanes were painted silver with RAF insignia. Royal Air Force roundels were painted on the wings and fuselage; a red, white and blue fin flash was painted on the vertical stabilizer. NC1776 was distinguished from the other 48 Flitfires by the full words "Royal Air Force Benevolent Fund" painted on its fuselage to the rear of the RAF roundel; the other Flitfires had the abbreviated "R.A.F. Benevolent Fund". The name of the state of each aircraft was painted on its nose cowl. All Flitfires were manufactured at the Lock Haven plant in twelve days between 10 and 22 April 1941. The 49 Cubs were nicknamed "Flitfires" by Piper factory workers because of their markings, which were similar to the famed Supermarine Spitfire aircraft used during the Battle of Britain.

== From Lock Haven to New York ==
At Flushing Field in Queens, New York

The silver Cubs that made up the "Flitfire Brigade" left Lock Haven on Sunday, 27 April 1941. T.H. Miller of the Lehigh Aircraft Co. was flight commander. Considerable preparations were made to organize the flight into military formation. The Flitfires were flown in precise formation by Piper employee-pilots, known as Cub Fliers. William Piper flew in the Brigade as a line pilot. Seven squadrons of seven airplanes took off, one after another, under direction of squadron leaders that included William Piper's brother, Tony Piper. The Cubs landed at Allentown-Bethlehem Airport (now Lehigh Valley International Airport) for refueling. Despite 25 mph (40 km/h) winds, gusting to 35 mph (56 km/h), all Cubs landed in Allentown in 12 minutes. Five thousand people turned out to witness the quick refueling and departure.

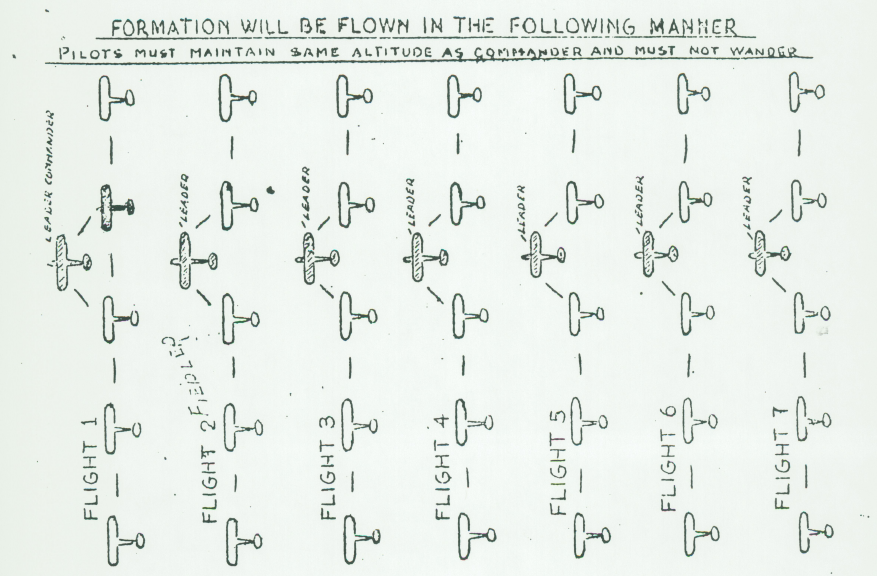
Flitfire Brigade's flight formation

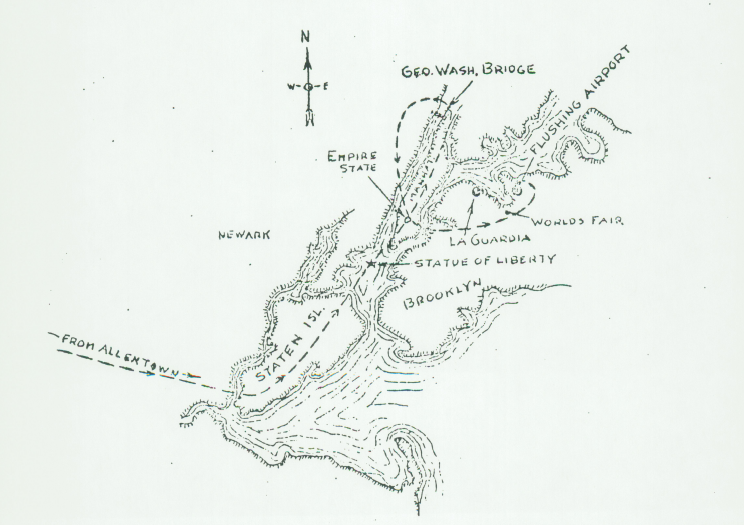
Flight path over New York City

After a mass take off from Allentown, the airplanes flew in formation over the New York metropolitan area. The formation flight was first seen over Staten Island at which point they dipped in salute to the Statue of Liberty; then proceeded over to Manhattan and Central Park and on to the George Washington Bridge. A wide swing to the left 180 degrees brought the brigade down the river to the Empire State Building, then east to a point south of the World's Fair grounds to Flushing Airport where they were parked before going on to LaGuardia Field.

On Tuesday, 29 April 1941, the Flitfires left Flushing Airport and were ferried to LaGuardia Field in groups of six, plus squadron leader flying in close formation. The normal $2.50 landing fee was waived by Mayor LaGuardia. Traffic was handled by airport cars using two way radios. Each aircraft was equipped with a portable radio loaned by Lear Avia Inc. Control of the flights was possible through these radio sets, despite the fact the Flitfires were not equipped with external antennas or shielded ignitions. The Flitfire Brigade's New York landing was the largest mass landing ever attempted up to that time.

== Gala at New York ==
More than 1,000 social and business leaders, stage and screen stars, and aviation enthusiasts attended a black tie event to celebrate the arrival of the Flitfire Cubs in New York City. Also in attendance were the guests of honor, several Royal Navy officers whose ship, the battleship HMS Malaya, was in New York for repair and refit. New York City Mayor Fiorello LaGuardia appointed Thomas Beck, President of the RAFBF, as the "Special and Extraordinary Mayor of the City of New York" from 9:00 p.m. until the close of the festivities. The airplanes were christened simultaneously by 48 fashion models who popped red, white and blue toy air balloons that were fastened to the propeller of each aircraft. With Mayor LaGuardia looking on, William Piper turned over the airplanes to Thomas Beck.

The festivities were held in the Kitty Hawk Room at the airport's administration building. There was a dinner and a show followed by cocktails. Next was the raffle drawing for NC1776, which was won by Jack Krindler from New York City. This was followed by games which included a garter toss and a state-of-the-art machine where guests could “Bomb Berlin for a Buck!” along with other entertainment. These activities raised more funds for the RAF. That night the 1,000 gala attendees raised an additional $12,000.00 for the RAFBF.

== Fund raising tours ==
The day after the ceremonies, the 48 Flitfires left LaGuardia for fund-raising tours, each heading to the state for which it was named. Subsequently, little is known about each Flitfire. Many distributors used joy rides and other gimmicks to raise money for families of RAF pilots who had been lost in combat. Some of the Flitfires were raffled off. Some Flitfires were sold to flight schools and continued to support the war by training pilots in the Civilian Pilot Training Program and the War Training Service (WTS).

Flitfire Texas in the field, ca. 1941 Hans Groenhoff Collection Smithsonian, NASM

The original Flitfire, NC1776, was flown all over the United States on a War Bond Tour by several pilots, including J. Raymond Worth, Leo Arany and Orville Wright. After touring the U.S., NC1776 was sold to Safair, a fixed-base operator (FBO) located in Sunbury, Pennsylvania, where it served as a training plane for the Department of Defense. On 9 August 1941, a 17-year-old high school senior, Kenneth A Turner, won "Flitfire New Jersey" at the Basking Ridge Fire Company's 32nd annual carnival. Turner immediately sold it for $1,200.00 to the Army Air Corps flight training facility at Somerset Hills Airport. In September 1941, Ivan Stone of West Virginia flew his Flitfire to the now abandoned Princeton Airport in West Virginia. Also in 1941, Leo Arany flew a Flitfire to Clatsop Airport in Astoria, Oregon. In June 1941 Lon Cooper, a Civilian U.S. Army Air Corps Primary Flight Instructor, reported training in a silver Flitfire at Johnston Flying Service at Albert Whitted Airport in St. Petersburg, Florida. "Flitfire Wisconsin" was purchased 24 April 1941 by Stainislaw Aircraft Inc., a Piper dealer in West Bend, Wisconsin. It was sold to Racine Flying Service, Inc. in July 1941, who operated it in Wisconsin until 1951.

== Current Flitfires ==
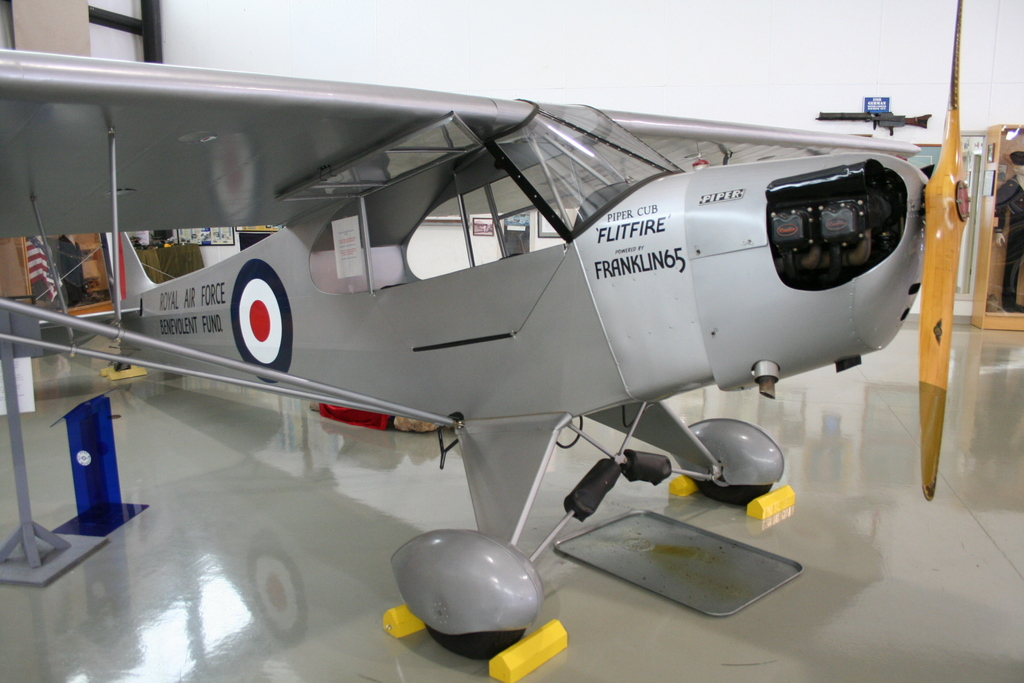
Flitfire NC1776 at the North Carolina Aviation Museum

After the war, all the Flitfires vanished into private hands and into obscurity. Over the next 70 years many became non-airworthy. The few still flying were repainted the traditional yellow Cub color, concealing the Flitfire's history. As more was learned about their unique story, several were restored back to their original paint scheme. In 1991 "Flitfire Wisconsin", the 22nd Cub to come off Piper's Flitfire line on 16 April 1941, was restored at Rickenbacker International Airport in Columbus, Ohio. It was the first Flitfire aircraft in the United States to be restored to the original 1941 colors.

Since then at least three other Flitfires are known to have been restored to their original silver-doped finish: "Flitfire NC1776", "Flitfire New Jersey" and "Flitfire Indiana". After a meticulous restoration, "Flitfire NC1776" is on display at the North Carolina Aviation Museum in Asheboro, North Carolina. In 2015 "Flitfire New Jersey" won the Sentimental Journey Award for Best J-3 Cub. Also as of 2015, twelve Flitfires are airworthy and registered with the FAA. In 1963 a Flitfire was exported to Canada and in 1971 another was exported to Germany. In 1992 the Flitfire in Germany was reported to still be flying.
