= The Spirit =

The Spirit may refer to:

- Holy Spirit, a concept in Abrahamic religions
- The Spirit (character), a fictional character in American comic books
  - The Spirit (1987 film), an American superhero film
  - The Spirit (2008 film), an American superhero film
- The Spirit (album), a 1991 album by Magnum
- "The Spirit" (Third Watch), an episode of the television series Third Watch

== See also ==
- In the Spirit (disambiguation)
- Spirit (disambiguation)
