= Sea Sprite =

Sea Sprite may refer to:

- Sprite (creature), a broad term referring to a number of supernatural legendary creatures
- Sea Sprite Sailing Yachts, a series of sail boats
- Kaman SH-2 Seasprite, a series of helicopters
- Purcell Sea Sprite, an experimental homebuilt glider aircraft
