= Cryogenine =

Chemical compound

Clinical data
- ATC code: none

Identifiers
- IUPAC name: (10α)-4,5-dimethoxy-2-hydroxylythran-12-one
- CAS Number: 10308-13-1
- PubChem CID: 5315204
- ChemSpider: 4474587
- UNII: OR77C8W8TA
- ChEMBL: ChEMBL1173218
- CompTox Dashboard (EPA): DTXSID201099973

Chemical and physical data
- Formula: C_{26}H_{29}NO_{5}
- Molar mass: 435.520 g·mol^{−1}
- 3D model (JSmol): Interactive image
- SMILES: O=C/4O[C@H]5C[C@@H]1N(CCCC1)[C@H](c2cc(OC)c(OC)cc2c3c(O)ccc(c3)\C=C\4)C5
- InChI: InChI=1S/C26H29NO5/c1-30-24-14-19-20(15-25(24)31-2)22-13-18(12-17-5-3-4-10-27(17)22)32-26(29)9-7-16-6-8-23(28)21(19)11-16/h6-9,11,14-15,17-18,22,28H,3-5,10,12-13H2,1-2H3/b9-7-/t17-,18+,22+/m1/s1; Key:WCZWUYYJZVBKDZ-VMSBZHFZSA-N

Cryogenine, also known as vertine or (10α)-4,5-dimethoxy-2-hydroxylythran-12-one, is a biphenylquinolizidine lactone alkaloid from the plants Sinicuichi (Heimia salicifolia) and H. myrtifolia. It has been supposed that cryogenine is the active hallucinogenic component of Sinicuichi. However, the compound reportedly showed no psychoactive properties in humans up to 310 mg orally, but has shown anti-inflammatory activity similar to aspirin.

The freebase form melts at 250–251 °C and is soluble in moderately polar organic solvents such as chloroform, methylene chloride, benzene, and methanol, but is insoluble in water and petroleum ether.

In the development of thin layer chromatography plates with diazotized p-nitroaniline spray, cryogenine produces a purple spot (as does sinicuichine, another biphenylquinolizidine lactone alkaloid found in Heimia species).

== See also ==
- List of hallucinogens
