= Petroleum spirits =

Petroleum spirit(s) may refer to:

- Petrol (or Gasoline), a clear petroleum-derived flammable liquid that is used primarily as a fuel
- Petroleum ether, liquid hydrocarbon mixtures used chiefly as non-polar solvents
- White spirit or mineral spirits, a common organic solvent used in painting and decorating

== See also ==
- Petroleum, a naturally occurring black liquid found in geological formations
