= North Carolina Aviation Museum =

North Carolina Aviation Museum and Hall of Fame

- Location in North Carolina North Carolina Aviation Museum (the United States)
- Established: 1994
- Location: Asheboro, North Carolina, USA
- Coordinates: 35.650902°N 79.894107°W
- Type: Aviation museum
- Founder: Jim Peddycord
- Curator: Larry Kirby
- Website: www.ncaviationmuseumhalloffame.com

The North Carolina Aviation Museum and North Carolina Aviation Hall of Fame displays a collection across two hangars of static aircraft, uniforms and memorabilia, and an extensive collection of aircraft models. Nearly all aircraft on display are privately owned and on loan. All aircraft on display are kept in flight-worthy condition and the collection changes periodically. Aircraft restoration and museum operations is performed by a small staff of paid employees along with volunteers. It is not to be confused with the Carolinas Aviation Museum, located in Charlotte.

== History ==
Founded in 1994 by Asheboro businessman Jim Peddycord as the Foundation for Aircraft Conservation, what would eventually become the museum first started out with a couple of his "warbirds" and an empty hangar at the Asheboro Regional Airport.

In 1996, Peddycord spearheaded an air show held in June to generate support for the museum. About this time, Bob Moon offered to serve as the facility's first manager. During Moon's three years there, he assembled dozens of aircraft of all types, which he would later donate to the facility. Many of those models still hang from the NCAM's gift shop ceiling, which was named after him following Moon's October 2007 death.

In 1997, a second air show was scheduled for June 5. Peddycord and his son Rick were killed the day before the event when their two aircraft collided in mid-air during practice. The facility was renamed the Peddycord Foundation for Aircraft Conservation (PFAC) in Peddycord's honor; another local businessman, Craig Branson, continued the effort to draw support for the PFAC.

In 1998, Branson purchased a B-25 for restoration and generated enough local support to have a second hangar built to house the aircraft. The aircraft was completely restored in 2004 and made limited flights in 2004-5.

In 2001-2, the facility was renamed The North Carolina Aviation Museum, reflecting an expanded mission that included artifacts, uniforms, weapons, artwork and models. During this time-frame, the NCAM was also designated as the official site for the North Carolina Aviation Hall of Fame. Both names were combined and now the facility is referred to as the North Carolina Aviation Museum and Hall of Fame.

Branson died in 2006. In 2008, the museum featured a F4U-4 Corsair, courtesy of Classic Fighters of America pilot Doug Matthews, one of an estimated 40 air-worthy examples in the world.

== Collection ==
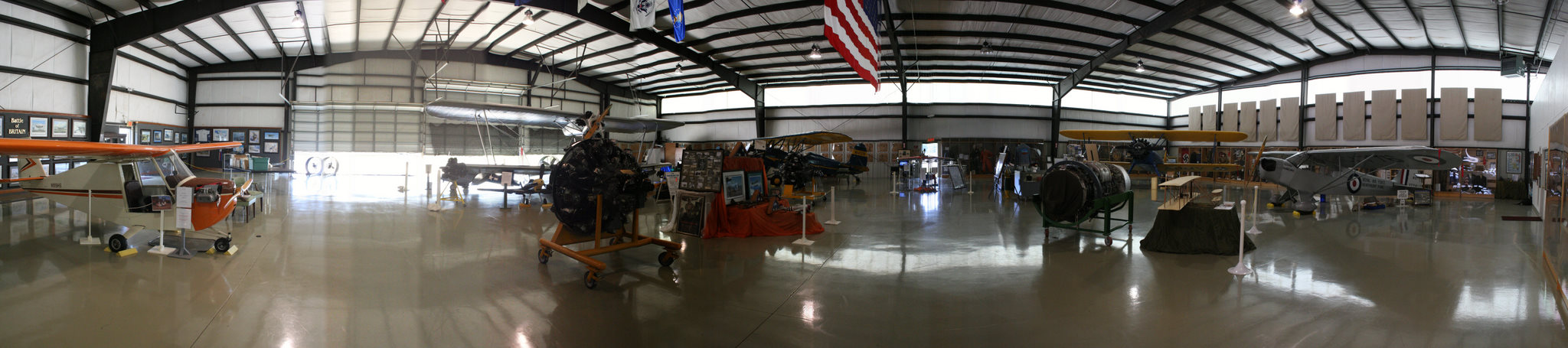
NCAM Hangar 1 in September 2010.

=== Current ===
==== Aircraft ====
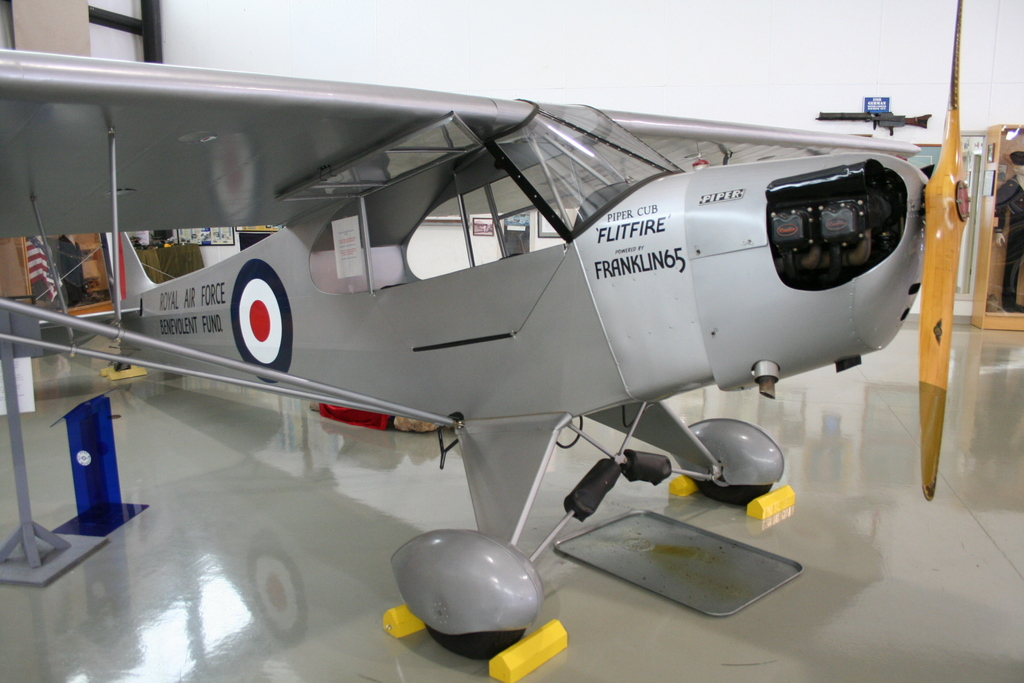
Piper J-3 Flitfire

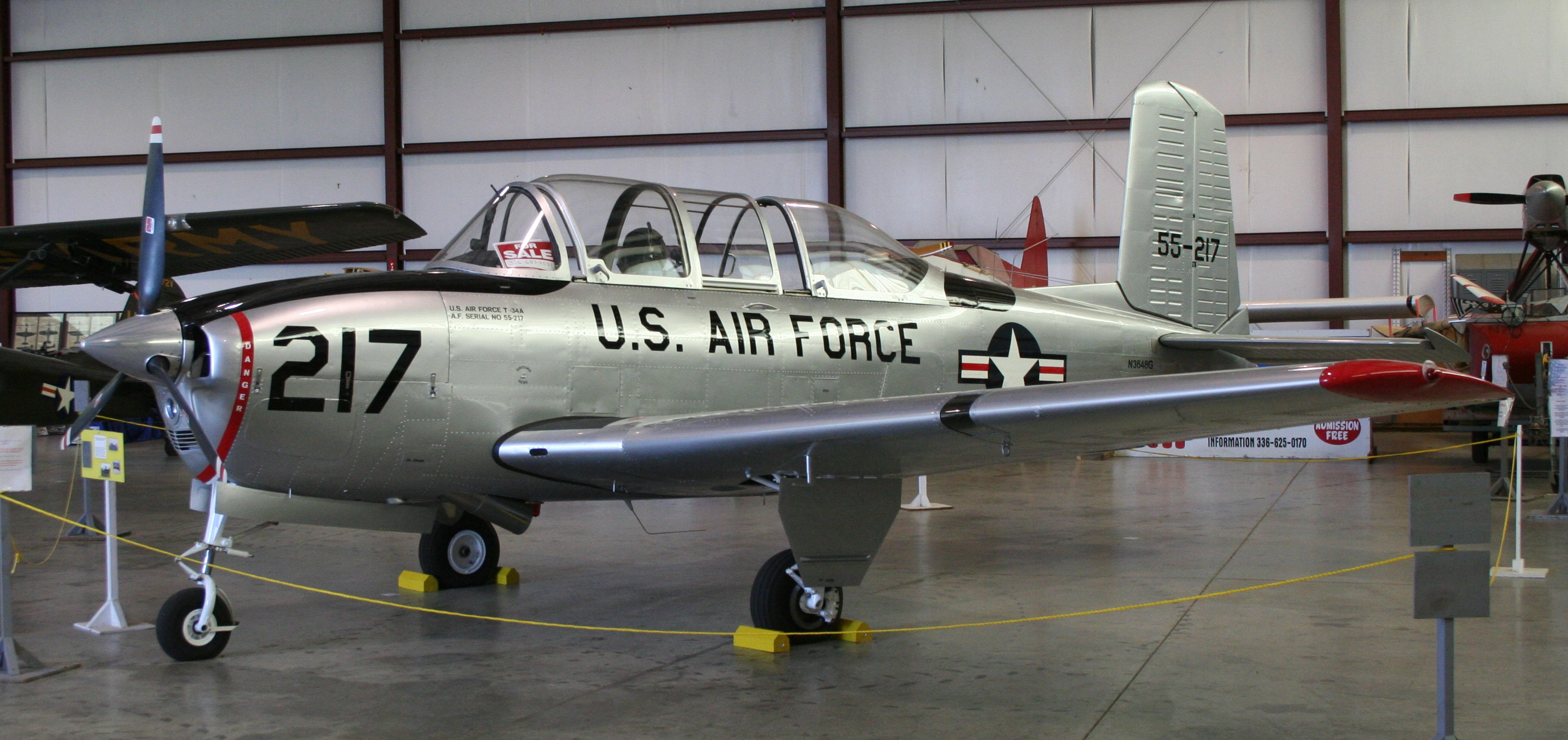
T34-A

- Piper J-3 Flitfire - Orville Wright flew in this plane in 1943 (as part of a fund-raising campaign for the RAF Benevolent Fund by Piper Aircraft Company).
- 1930 Savoia-Marchetti S.56, one of only two remaining in the world. It is on three-year loan from the Reynolda House Museum of American Art in Winston-Salem, N.C.
- Cessna L-19 Bird Dog - A Korean War era aircraft designed to identify enemy operating positions.
- Stearman PT-13D Kaydet- a standard primary trainer flown by the United States and several allied nations during the late 1930s through World War II.
- Beechcraft T-34 Mentor - a propeller-driven, single-engined, military trainer aircraft derived from the Beechcraft Model 35 Bonanza. It was listed for sale as of Oct. 1, 2010)
- Pilatus P-3 - Swiss primary training aircraft, Switzerland's attempt to create an aircraft similar in design and function to the T-34 "Mentor."
- Fairchild F-22- Two-seat, light sport/utility plane.
- Shehane Aerosport Quail - Experimental aircraft built in 1978, uses Volkswagen engine for power plant, one of a kind.
- Denney Kitfox - complete frame, awaiting engine, skin, controls before construction can begin.
- Purcell Sea Sprite - a 1975 experimental aircraft, one of a kind.
- Purcell Flightsail Pelican - a 1990s experimental aircraft, one of a kind.
- Rutan VariEze - composite canard aircraft, 1st sold in N.C., 3rd sold in U.S., currently under active restoration as of June 1, 2010 by Mike/Ryan White.
- Link Trainers - flight simulators awaiting restoration, used for pilot training from the 1930s until the early 1960s.
- BAI Aerospace Unmanned Aerial Vehicle - was used aboard the Coast Guard Cutter, the USS Harriet Lane until 2002.
- Curtis Wright J-65 jet engine

==== Vehicles ====
- WWII era Plymouth staff car
- 1942 Harley-Davidson motorcycle
- 1977 Army Jeep
- President Truman's Presidential Limo / armored car

=== Past ===
- F4U-4 Corsair
- B-25
- Beechcraft C-45A
- Beechcraft T-34 Mentor

== Large scale models ==
In addition to 150+ aircraft models displayed suspended from the ceiling of the gift shop, the collection includes scale models with wingspans of up to ten feet:

- 1903 Wright Flyer
- P-47D Thunderbolt
- BF-19 Messerschmitt
- P-51 Mustang

== Fly-in ==
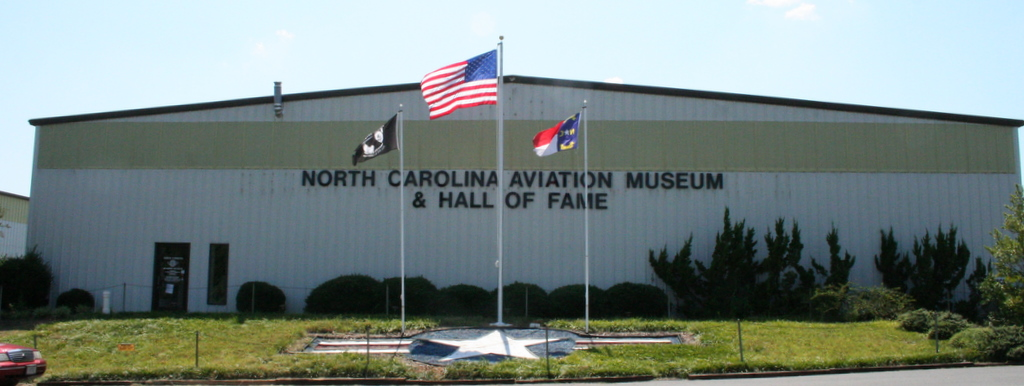
NCAM exterior

Since 1996, the museum has sponsored a fly-in the second Saturday in June. The event includes visiting aircraft displays, free small airplane flights for children, helicopter rides, a racing car exhibit, Ham Radio demonstrations, face painting by the Marines, remote control model aircraft, and scale model displays. In 2009, the "NCAM's Third Annual Fly-In attracted about 80 aircraft and 1,500 patrons. At the fourth fly-in in 2010, those figures jumped to 150 aircraft and more than 2,500 people. On the day of the 2012 Fly in, there were between 120 and 150 airplanes including the Korean War Hero and a Beech 18 and over 1,000 patrons.

== See also ==
- Carolinas Aviation Museum
- North American aviation halls of fame
