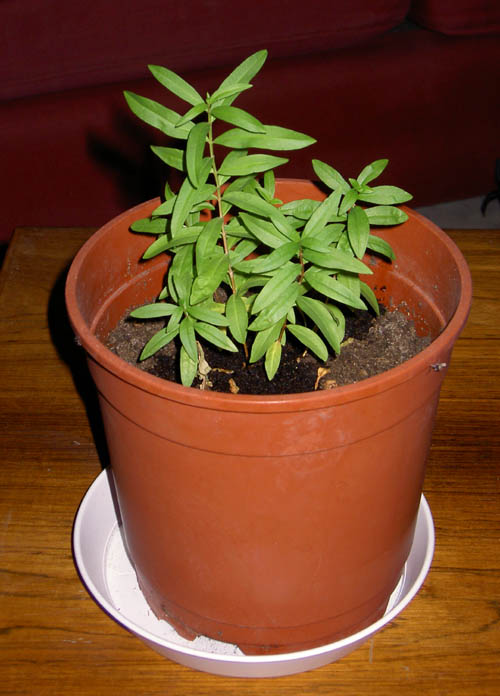
- Heimia salicifolia

Scientific classification
- Kingdom: Plantae
- Clade: Tracheophytes
- Clade: Angiosperms
- Clade: Eudicots
- Clade: Rosids
- Order: Myrtales
- Family: Lythraceae
- Subfamily: Lythroideae
- Genus: Heimia; Link

Species
- Heimia montana Heimia myrtifolia Heimia salicifolia

= Heimia =

Genus of plants

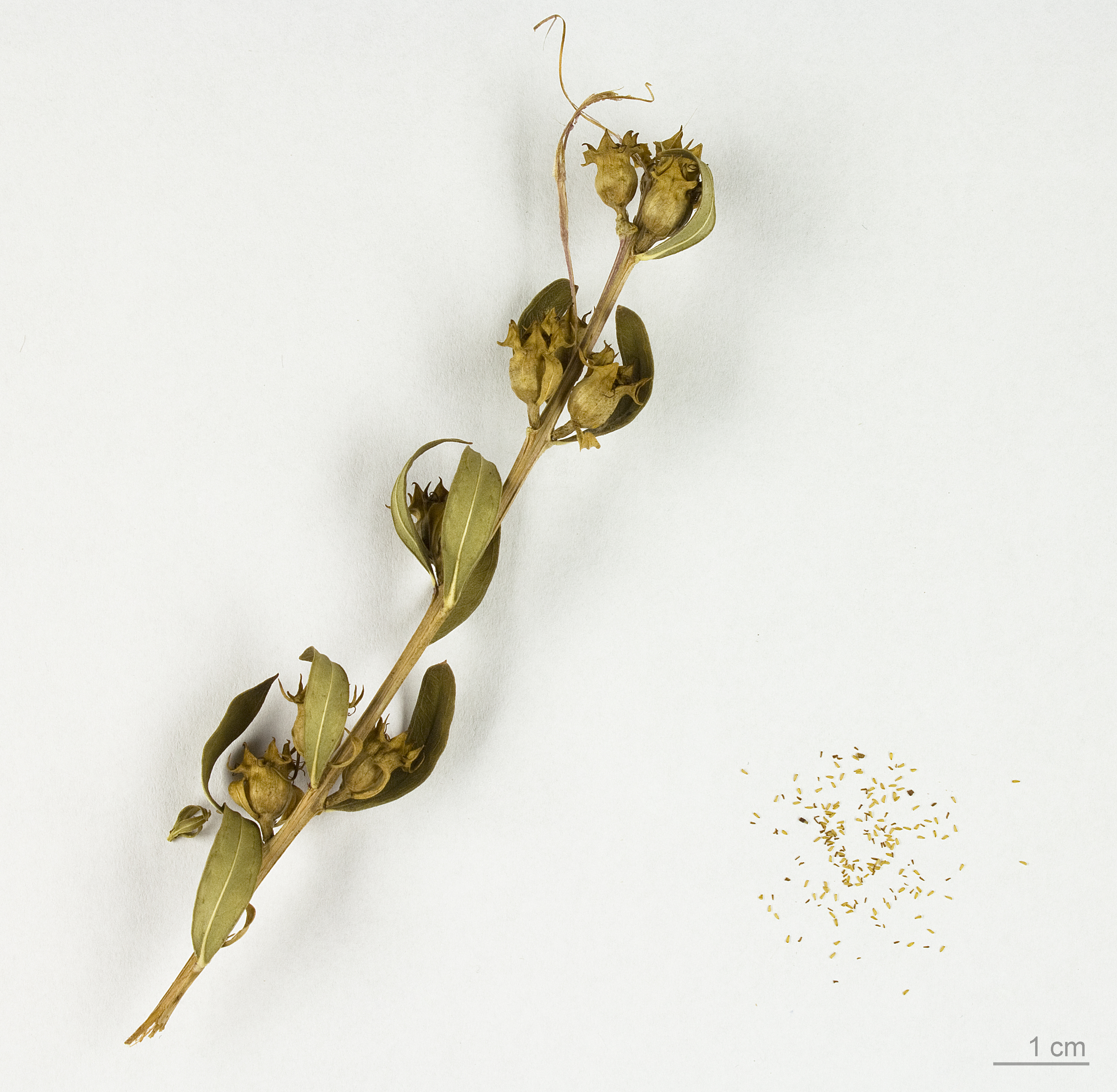
Heimia salicifolia - MHNT

Heimia is a genus of flowering plants in the loosestrife family, Lythraceae. It contains two or three species of closely related shrubs commonly known as sun opener or shrubby yellowcrest. They are native to the Americas, from northern Argentina north to the southernmost United States (southern Texas). The leaves are 2–5 cm long and 1 cm broad, entire, and variably arranged alternate, opposite or whorled on the stems. All species produce five-petaled yellow flowers. The plants have a history of medicinal use in a variety of American cultures. Several pharmacologically active alkaloids have been detected in the plants. The generic names honours German physician Ernst Ludwig Heim (1747–1834).

== Species ==
The genus contains three species. They are similar to the extent that expert knowledge is required to differentiate between specimens of the different species. The alkaloid contents of specimens of all three species has been studied, and although similar, they have been found to be chemically distinct.

=== Heimia myrtifolia ===
Heimia myrtifolia is a shrub growing to 1 m tall. The yellow flowers are 5 petaled and 1 cm in diameter. The leaves are approximately 5 mm wide by 2–3 cm long.

=== Heimia salicifolia ===
Heimia salicifolia, commonly known as Sinicuichi, is a shrub growing to 3 m tall. The yellow flowers are 5 petaled and 2–3 cm in diameter. The leaves are approximately 1 cm wide and 3–5 cm long.

=== Heimia montana ===
Heimia montana is a shrub growing to about 1–2 m tall. The yellow flowers are 5-petaled and slightly smaller than those of Heimia salicifolia, usually around 1–1.5 cm in diameter. The leaves are narrow, lanceolate, about 5–8 mm wide and 2–4 cm long, and occur densely along the stems.

== Secondary metabolites ==
The alkaloid content is similar between the species in the genus. The following substances have been detected in Heimia salicifolia:

=== Alkaloids ===
- 9-beta-Hydroxyvertine
- (2S,4S,10R)-4-(3-Hydroxy-4-methoxyphenyl)-quinolizidin-2-acetate
- Lythrine
- Dehydrodecodine
- Lythridine
- Cryogenine
- Heimidine
- Lyfoline
- epi-Lyfoline
- Sinicuichine
- Nesodine
- Abresoline
- Anelisine
- Lythridine (sinine)

== History ==
Heimia myrtifolia and Heimia salicifolia are often reported to have hallucinogenic effects. This controversial attribution of effects appears to be traceable back to a publication by J. B. Calderón in 1896 who wrote that it was said to possess a "curious and unique physiological action ... people drinking either a decoction or the juice of the plant have a pleasant drunkenness ... all objects appear yellow and the sounds of bells, human voices or any other reach their ears as if coming from a long distance."

Calderón actually tested the plant and did not experience any noticeable effects. Through a series of exaggerating and dramatizing citations, especially by Victor A. Reko in the first half of the last century, the plant became known as a hallucinogen despite that psychoactive properties of the plant have never been demonstrated. The mildly psychoactive effects described in the original publication have therefore been attributed to a sedative principle or unknown other contents of the brew or, simply, to its alcohol content.

In 1926, Reko observed that the native people of Mexico also called the stem and bark of Erythrina coralloides, the bark of Piscidia erythrina, and the seeds of Rhynochosia praecatoria by the name of sinicuichi, which may have contributed to the scientific confusion.

== Cultivation ==
Seeds of H. salicifolia

The species make attractive ornamental plants, flowering in late summer. Although only growing as a shrub in subtropical climates, it can also be grown as a herbaceous perennial in colder areas where the above-ground growth is killed by winter cold. The plants produce very many tiny seeds which are easily cultivated. Both species prefer well-drained soil with a good supply of water.
