= Spirit (media personality) =

American television and radio personality

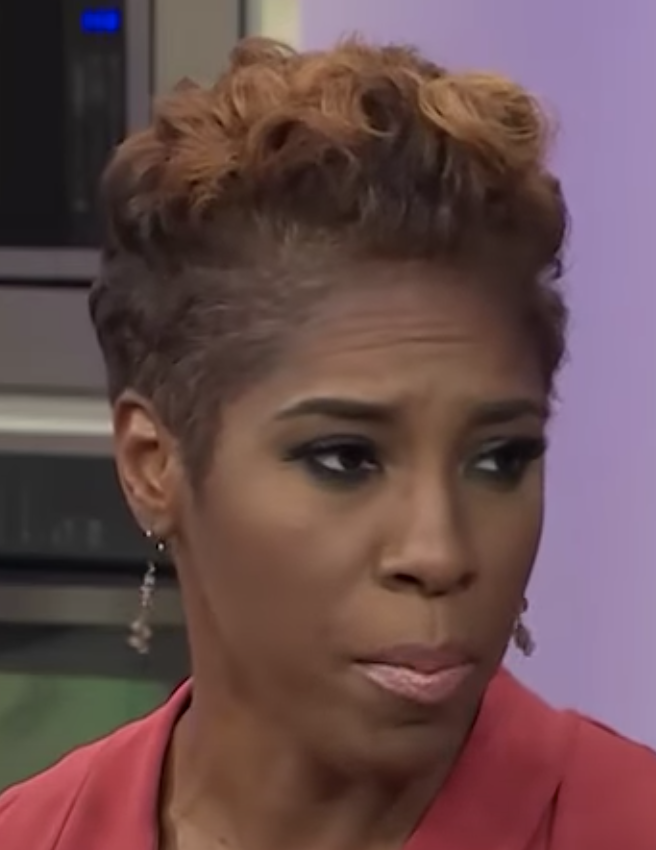
Spirit in September 2019.

SPIRIT (born December 20, 1975) is an American television and radio personality, licensed therapist, author, and public speaker. Spirit first gained the attention of a national audience with appearances on The Tyra Banks Show in 2008.

== Professional ==
Spirit is a National Certified Counselor (NCC), Licensed Professional Counselor (LPC), certified Parenting Coordinator (PC), and Child Sexual Abuse Prevention Facilitator. She holds a Bachelor of Science degree in Psychology, a Master of Arts degree in Professional Counseling, and is scheduled to complete a Doctorate of Philosophy in General Psychology with a specialization in Research Methods and Evaluation in the fall of 2019. Spirit owns a private counseling practice in Atlanta, GA and is a devoted wife and mother of seven.

== Radio ==
Spirit’s media career first began over a decade ago when she first co-hosted the nightly sex talk show, The Pleazure Zone (2003, 2004), on News & Talk Radio, 1380 WAOK in Atlanta, Georgia. The three-hour, live call-in show gave listeners answers and information about love, sex, relationships. Following The Pleazure Zone, Spirit went on to host her own weekly talk show, Talking with Spirit on WAOK, which went on to become a nightly talk show on XM satellite radio’s channel 169, and was also simulcast on Miami’s 1080 WTPS and Chicago’s 1690 WVON. Spirit also co-hosted the weekly love, sex, and relationship talk show, Let’s Stay Together, on Atlanta’s WPZE 102.5 FM. Since first hitting the airwaves, Spirit has gone on to make over 200 radio appearances across the country. She can currently be heard making regular appearances on the syndicated radio show, The Rickey Smiley Morning Show (2014-2018),

== Television ==
Spirit first gained the attention of the national audience with appearances on The Tyra Banks Show in 2008. Following those appearances, Spirit went on to make multiple guest appearances on shows including, Mike and Juliette in the Morning, Good Day Atlanta on WAGA-TV Fox 5, The Ricki Lake Show (2012-2013), The Bill Cunningham Show, and most recently, Dr. Drew On Call on HLN. Spirit was also the co-host of 20th Century Fox Television's The Daily Helpline, which aired in select markets during the summer of 2014 and has been featured in programs on networks including Oxygen, WE TV, and the Hallmark Channel.
