= Entheogenics and the Maya =

Use of hallucinogenic plants by the Maya

The consumption of hallucinogenic plants as entheogens goes back to thousands of years. Psychoactive plants contain hallucinogenic particles that provoke an altered state of consciousness, which are known to have been used during spiritual rituals among cultures such as the Aztec, the Maya, and Inca. The Maya are indigenous people of Mexico and Central America that had significant access to hallucinogenic substances. Archaeological, ethnohistorical, and ethnographic data show that Mesoamerican cultures used psychedelic substances in therapeutic and religious rituals. The consumption of many of these substances dates back to the Olmec era (1200-400 BCE); however, Mayan religious texts reveal more information about the Aztec and Mayan civilization. These substances are considered entheogens because they were used to communicate with divine powers. "Entheogen," an alternative term for hallucinogen or psychedelic drug, derived from ancient Greek words ἔνθεος (entheos, meaning "full of the god, inspired, possessed") and γενέσθαι (genesthai, meaning "to come into being"). This neologism was coined in 1979 by a group of ethnobotanists and scholars of mythology. Some authors claim entheogens have been used by priests throughout history, with appearances in prehistoric cave art such as a cave painting at Tassili n'Ajjer, Algeria that dates to roughly 8000 BP. Shamans in Mesoamerica served to diagnose the cause of illness by seeking wisdom through a transformational experience by consuming drugs to learn the crisis of the illness.

== History of Maya entheogen use ==
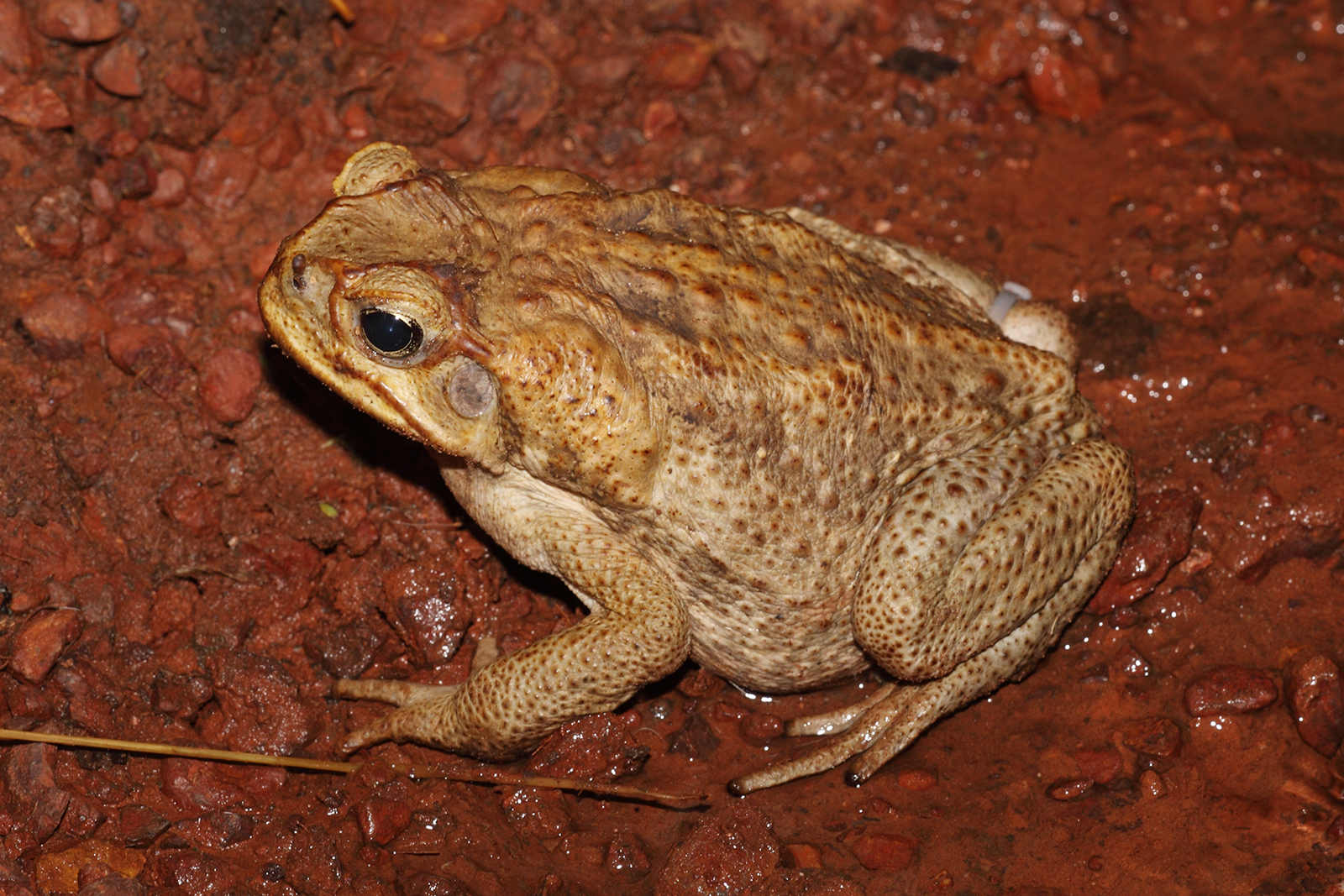
Female Rhinella marina (Cane toad)

One of the more unusual entheogens employed by the Maya was derived from the skin - and more especially the parotid glands - of the Cane toad, Rhinella marina (formerly known as Bufo marinus), a sacred figure throughout the history of Mesoamerican culture. The poison present in the skin of R. marina contains a number of Bufotoxins that can prove fatal, if the toxic secretion is prepared improperly or consumed in excess. The goal of such consumption of Cane toad toxin was generally communication with the spirit world, although recreational use may also have occurred. The primary method for inducing a psychedelic event was through the consumption of psychoactive plants and fungi. Some of the psychoactive components of these organisms were narcotic analgesics, psilocybin, mescaline, DMT, muscimol, and others. The main goals for the usage of these plants were for spiritual healing, spirit interaction, ancestral communication, enlightenment and wisdom gain, and religious ceremonies. The effects of psychedelic plants during religious rituals is believed to have had an impact on the development and creation of figures, sacred images, mythological creatures, spiritual figures. At present, most of the evidence comes from ancient Maya art and rare examples of residues of substances recovered from ceramic containers.

== Species and their effects ==
=== Tobacco and fermented drinks ===
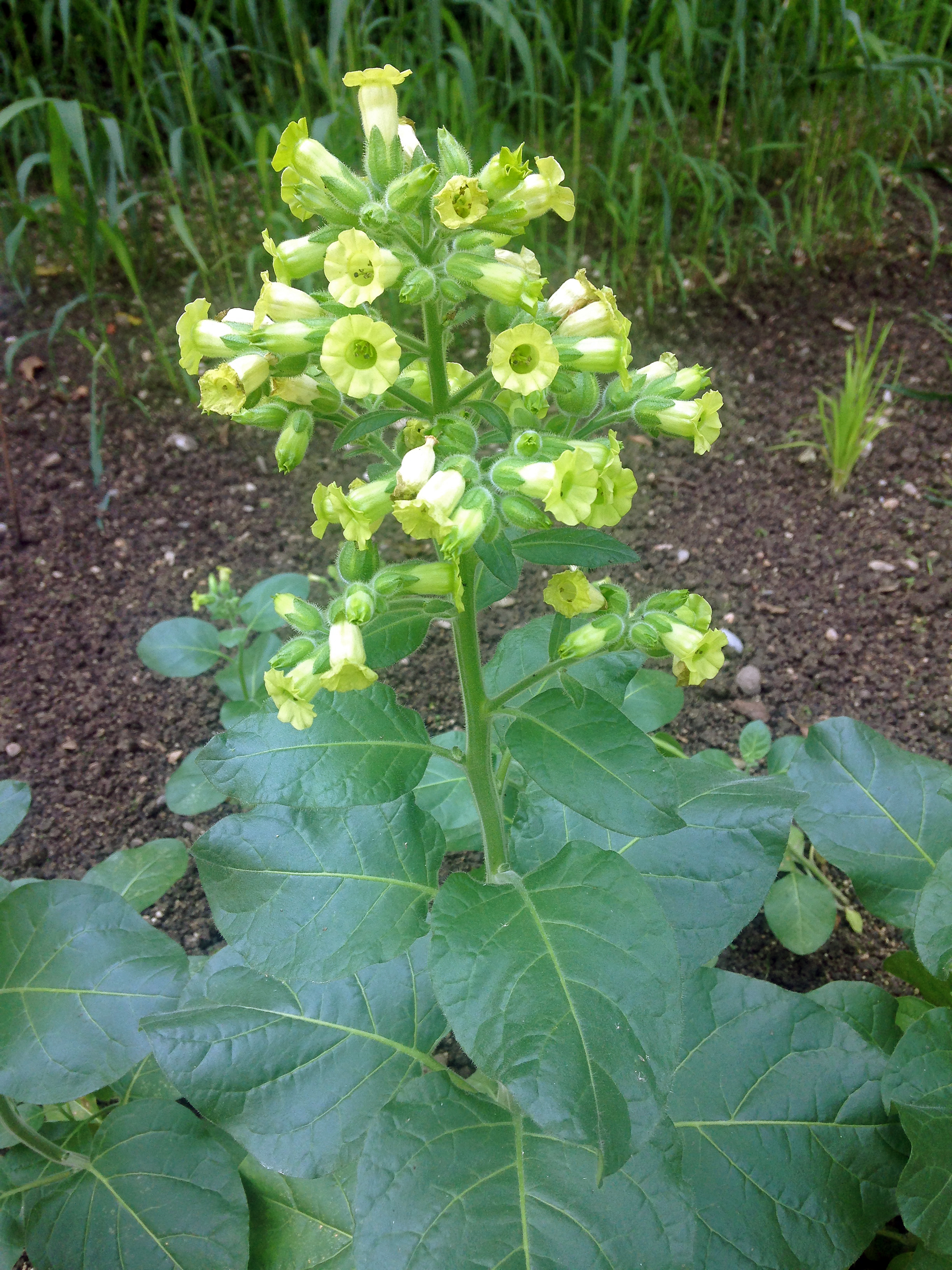
Nicotiana rustica (Maya: piziet)

Tobacco (Nicotiana spp.) contains the alkaloid nicotine, which affects the nervous system. Tobacco was smoked, inhaled, chewed, and occasionally mixed with the leaves of Datura, (another genus in the family Solanaceae, but, unlike Nicotiana, one rich in deliriant tropane alkaloids), which enhanced the hallucinogenic effect of the activity. Wild tobacco, which the Maya called 'piziet', also played a part in sacred ceremonies. It is believed that certain substances were used to produce visions and to minimize pain caused by self-sacrifice, a common practice in Mayan civilization.

The Maya used enemas, a procedure in which liquid or gas is injected into the rectum, to manage certain substances in order to intensify the effect of the drug. Archaeological evidence provides us with ceramic goods that depict images in which psychedelic enemas were utilized in rituals; some figures are vomiting while others receive enemas. The paintings on ceramic vessels from the Mayan late classic period show pots overflowing with foam from fermented drinks, depict individuals talking to one another as they receive enemas.

The Maya also consumed an alcoholic beverage called balché, which is an infusion of the bark of Lonchocarpus longistylus (see page Lonchocarpus violaceus) mixed with honey from bees fed on a type of morning glory with a high ergine content. Intoxication was associated with the practice of divination, a ritual meant to facilitate direct interaction with the spirits to foretell the future or understand events that would otherwise be unclear, including illness, a shift in fortune, and the results of war. Since the alcoholic content of balché seemed to have been relatively low, it had to be ingested in large quantities to reach a significant level of drunkenness.

Pulque was another alcoholic drink made by fermenting the sap of the maguey plant. Different ceramic products from the classic Mayan period produced vessels marked with symbols of pulque. Archaeologists have discovered murals of figures drinking pulque in a group ceremony, and show individuals combining psychoactive substances with balché, while smoking wild Mesoamerican tobacco when performing ritual enemas. Pulque also served as a tranquilizer for sacrificial victims when participating in public rituals. Maya victim handlers made the sacrificial victims drunk so that they would not be afraid of the sacrificial practice. Besides smoking the dried leaves, the Maya also consumed their tobacco by making tea out of it and ingesting the liquid.

=== Mushrooms ===
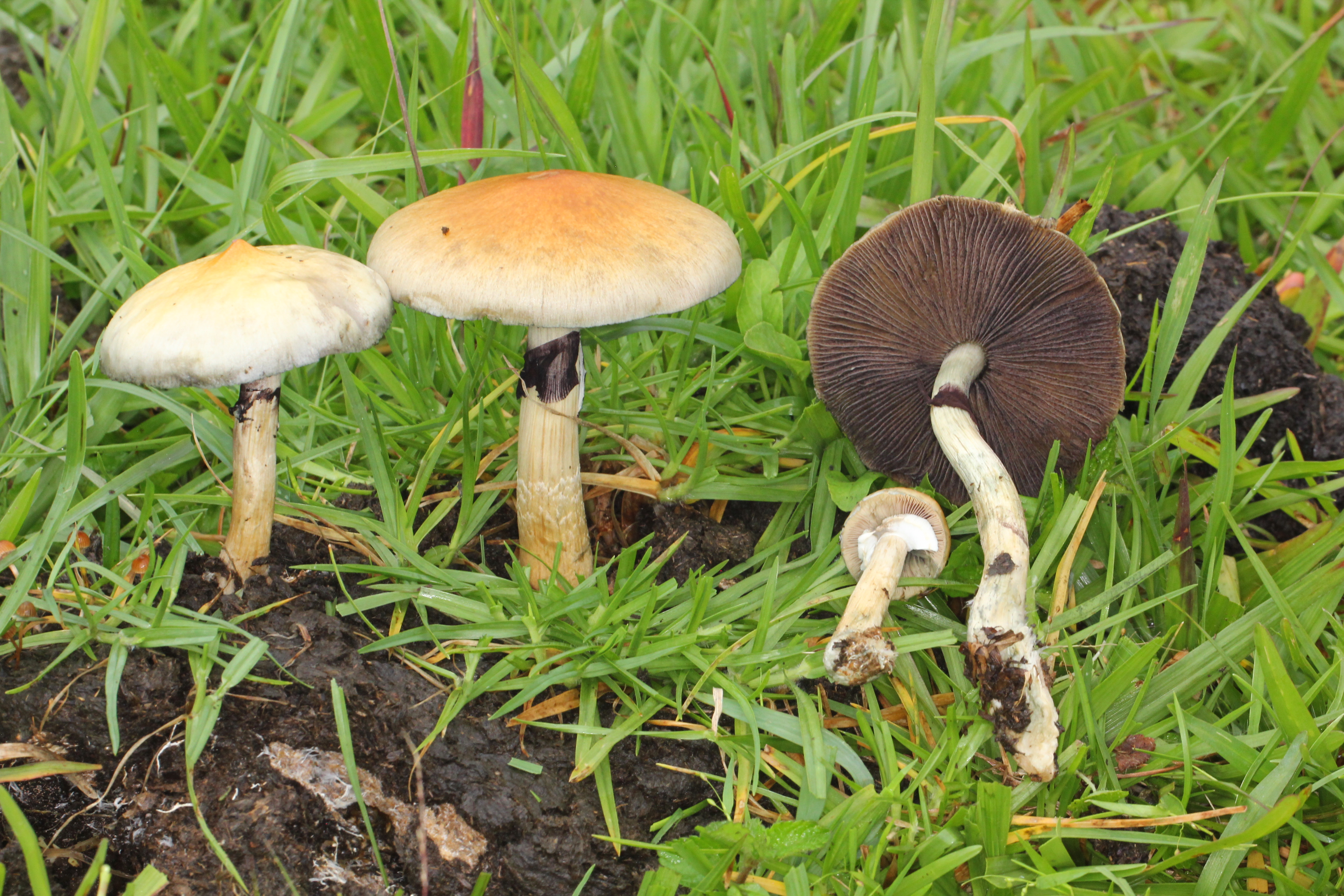
Psilocybe cubensis (Maya: k'aizalaj okox)

The consumption of hallucinogenic mushrooms in ritual ceremonies was popular among Mesoamerican cultures. Religious practices with sacred mushrooms extend from the Valley of Mexico to the rest of Central America, and they are thought to be at least 3500 years old. The Maya consumed k'aizalaj okox, otherwise known as teonanàcatl to the Aztecs which is a psychedelic mushroom that has been used in Mesoamerican cultures. The fungus contains two separate entheogenic compounds, psilocybin and psilocin that cause the user to experience visual hallucinations.

Archaeological evidence, in the form of the artifacts known as 'mushroom stones' points to consumption by the Maya of psychedelic mushrooms. These stones are often decorated with figures and were believed to have been used in an ancient hallucinogenic mushroom cult. After cataloging the stones by type and provenience, archaeologists dated their earliest appearance to approximately 1000 BC.

Mushroom stones were also believed to be associated with human decapitation, a trophy head cult, warfare and the Mesoamerican ballgame. Archaeological evidence provides another example of the consumption of hallucinogenic mushrooms, the Tepantitla mural in Teotihuacàn dates to 500 CE, which shows the Toltec rain god Tlaloc, with religious-like figures bearing hallucinogenic mushrooms springing up where his raindrops fall. Ancient Mayan Codices show mushrooms in Maya scenes of human sacrifice.

=== Water lilies ===
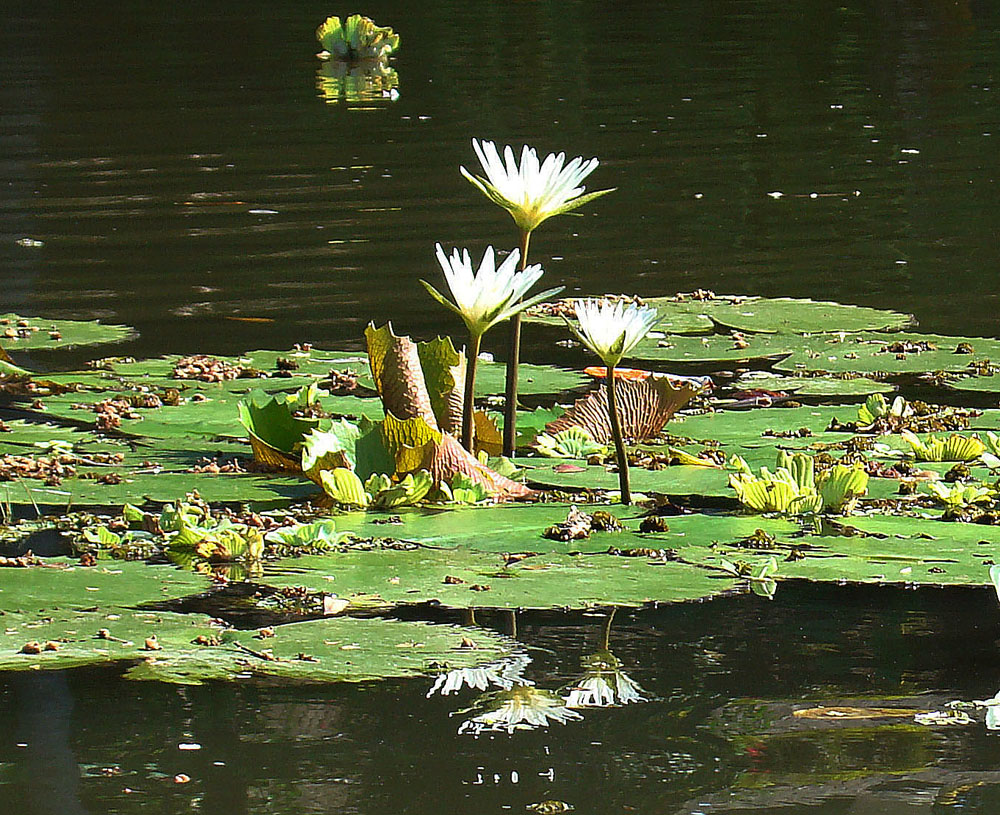
Nymphaea ampla, the Mayan or dotleaf waterlily

Nymphaea ampla, a white-flowered water lily, is another possible entheogen of significance for the Maya. Many scholars compare Nymphaea ampla to the blue lotus (Nymphaea caerulea) that was used extensively by ancient Egyptians. The water lily is widely represented in Maya art, especially in its depictions with jaguars and Maya kings. The cultural importance can somewhat be seen in the Mayan naming of the plant, nikte'ha' (Mayan for "vulva of the water") as it would have represented life, sexual activity, fertility, birth, etc. The plant causes opiate-like effects on the user and is known to have been used as a calming sedative and mild trance inducer.

=== Morning glories ===
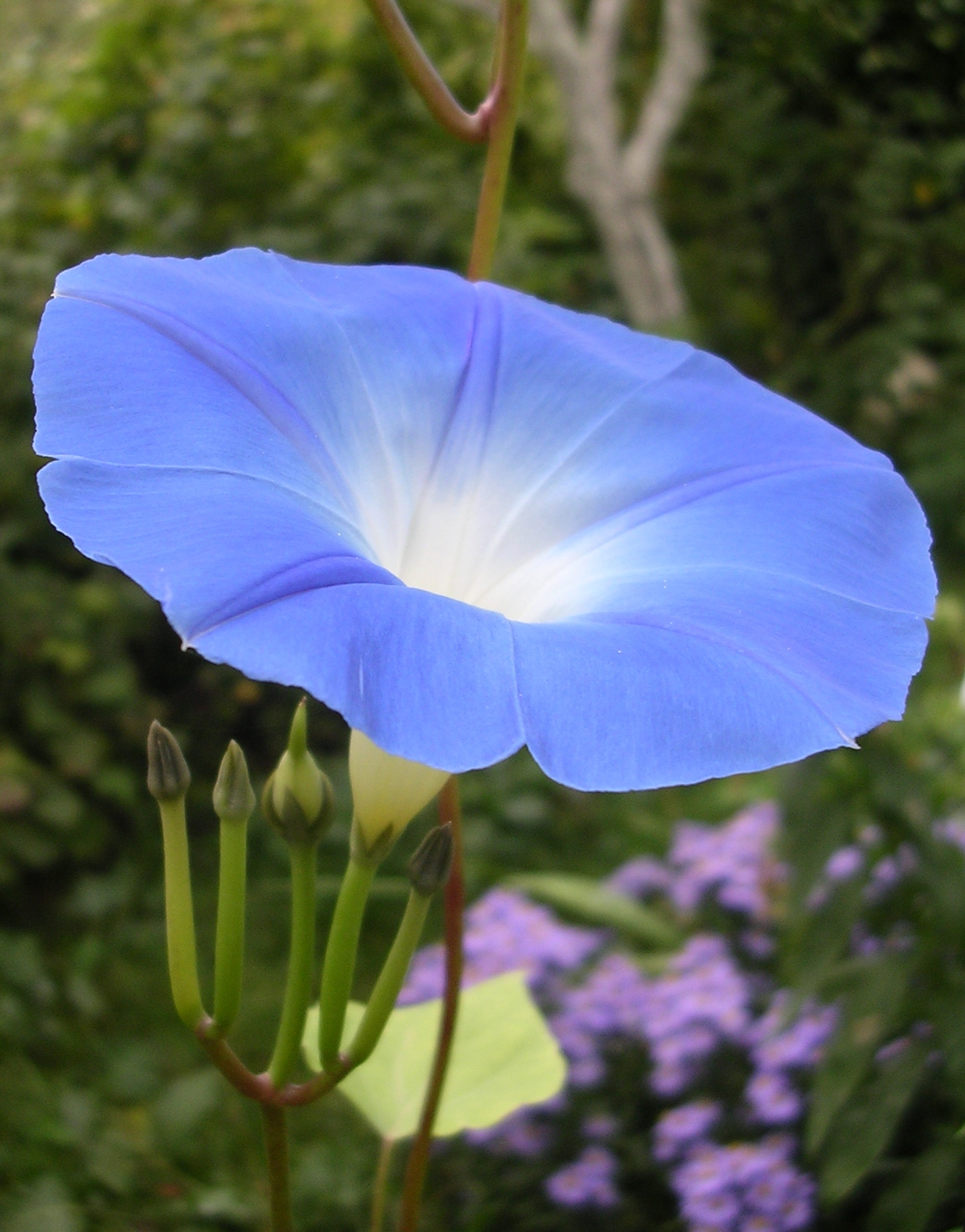
Ipomoea tricolor - one of two Morning Glory species employed by both Maya and Aztec as entheogens (image is of cultivar 'Heavenly Blue')

Ololiuqui (Ipomoea corymbosa), belongs to the plant family Convolvulaceae, noted for herbaceous ornamental plants with bell-shaped flowers. Different species of the family Convolvulaceae contain seeds with different alkaloids of the Lysergamide family, which produce powerful hallucinogenic visions, even when consumed in small doses. The other main entheogenic species employed by the Maya was Ipomoea tricolor (confusingly referred to in older literature, as I. violacea, which, despite its name, is exclusively a white-flowered species). The seeds of Ipomoea corymbosa and I. violacea were consumed by the Maya and Aztec for their psychotropic effects on perception and the emotions i.e. to evoke an altered state of consciousness).

It is believed that hundreds of seeds were ground into powder and then blended into a cacao beverage, and sometimes psychedelic mushrooms were added to the mixture. These seeds are still commonly used in Mexico today by healers or shamans who conduct healing ceremonies. Ololiuhqui is nicknamed Morning Glory due to its capacity to close during the night time and open during the day time. In Spanish, it is also known as flor de la virgen since it has featured in religious symbolism since the 16th century.

== See also ==
- Aztec use of entheogens
