= Purcell Sea Sprite =

Experimental homebuilt glider aircraft

The Purcell Sea Sprite was an experimental homebuilt glider aircraft. It was intended to be operated by experienced pilots under 200 feet attached to a tow boat. Created by Thomas H. Purcell Jr. of Raleigh, North Carolina, the aircraft weighed about 175 pounds and could be built from plans for about $400 (in 1975 dollars). There is a Sea Sprite on display at the North Carolina Aviation Museum in Asheboro, North Carolina.
