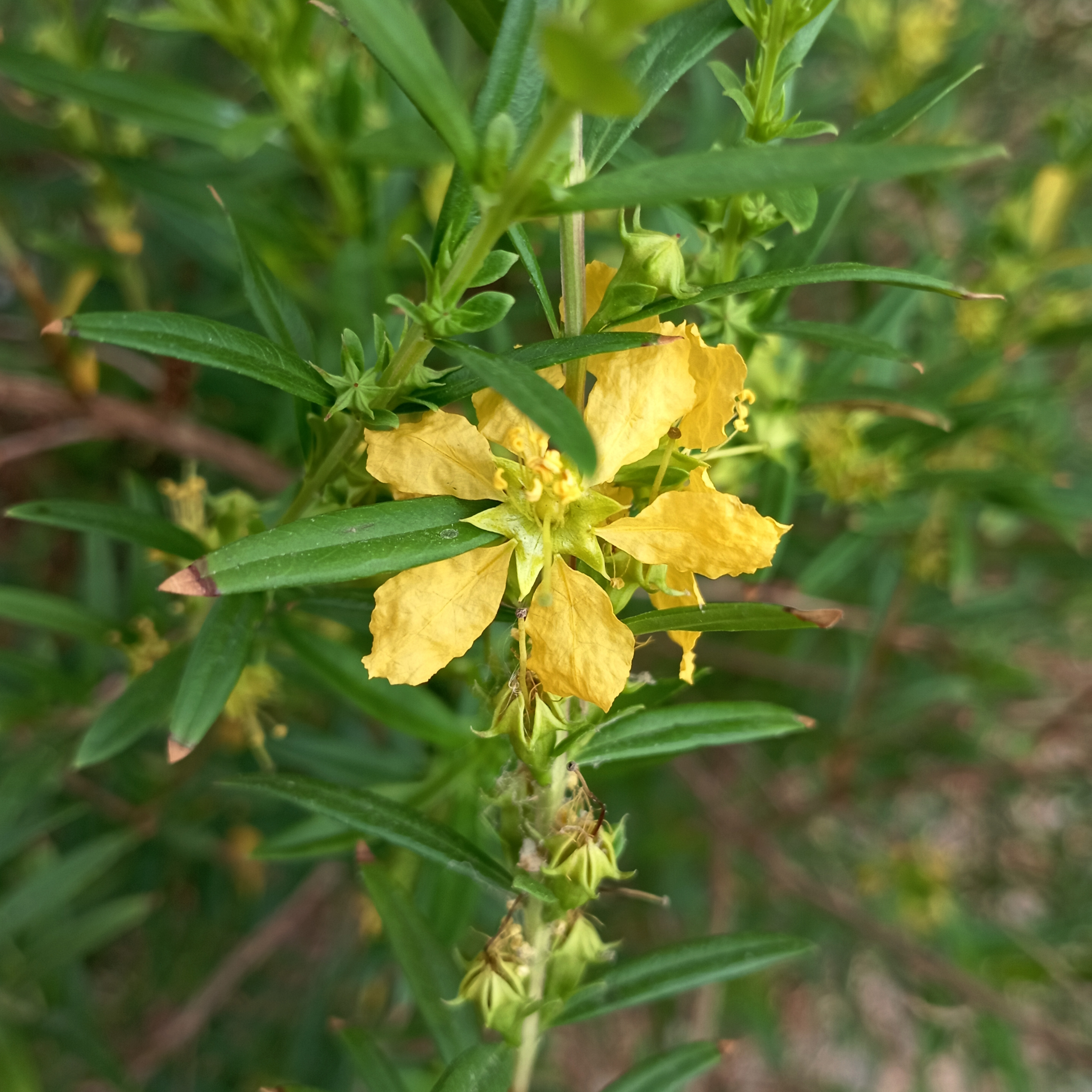

Conservation status
- Apparently Secure (NatureServe)

Scientific classification
- Kingdom: Plantae
- Clade: Embryophytes
- Clade: Tracheophytes
- Clade: Spermatophytes
- Clade: Angiosperms
- Clade: Eudicots
- Clade: Rosids
- Order: Myrtales
- Family: Lythraceae
- Genus: Heimia
- Species: H. salicifolia

Binomial name
- Heimia salicifolia Link

= Heimia salicifolia =

Species of plant

Heimia salicifolia is a species of flowering plant in the Loosestrife family, Lythraceae. It is native to the Americas, ranging from the southwestern United States (Texas and New Mexico) through Mexico and Central America to Argentina. Common names include shrubby yellowcrest, sinicuichi, sun opener, willow-leaf heimia, sini. The plant has been used for shamanic purposes by native peoples in Central America and Mexico.

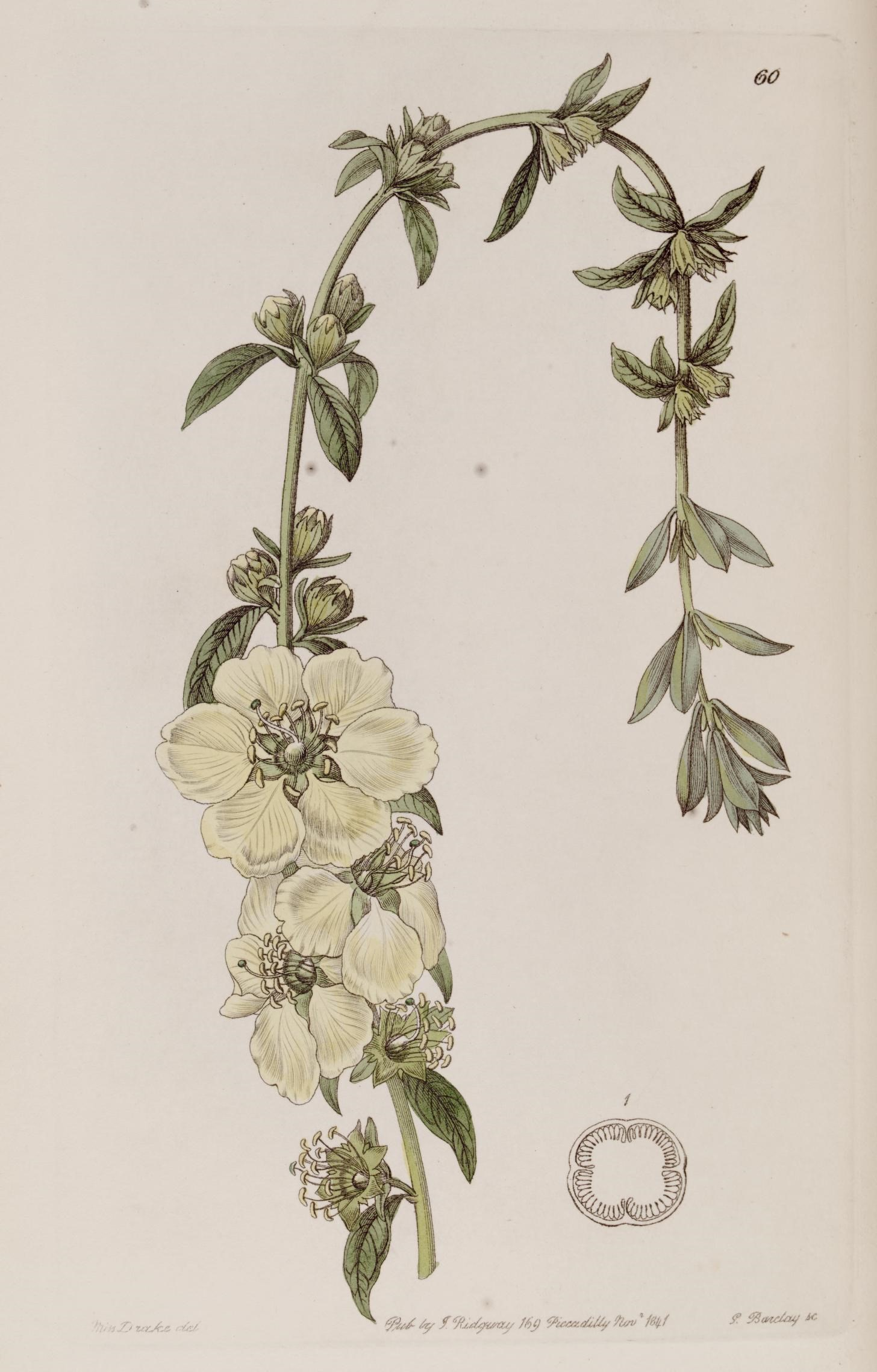
Pl. 60 Edwards's botanical register .

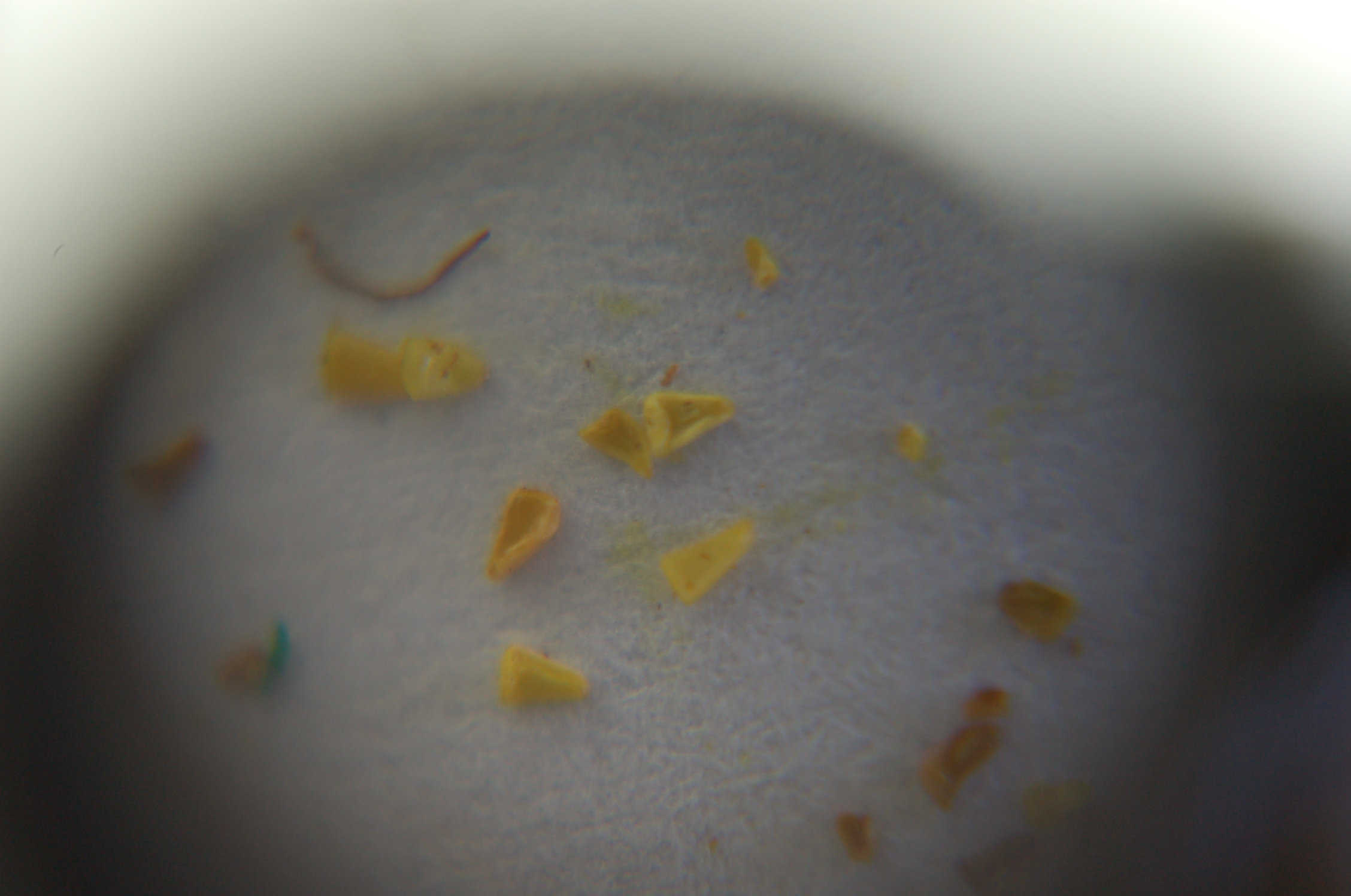
The seed of Heimia salicifoli magnified many times

== Isolated alkaloids ==
- Vertine, also known as cryogenine, is regarded as the primary bioactive component and is also generally the most abundant constituent of alkaloidal extracts.
- Lyfoline, the second most abundant alkaloid
- Lythrine, the third most abundant alkaloid
- Heimidine, a minor alkaloid
- Lythridine, a minor alkaloid

== Spiritual use ==
Use of H. salicifolia for shamanic purposes by native peoples of Central America and Mexico has been described. It is reported to produce both hallucinogenic effects and medical effects. In the method of preparation commonly used, fresh leaves are collected and allowed to wilt. The leaves are put into a cup or jar, cool water is added, and the mixture is placed in the sun to brew and ferment for at least 24 hours. It is said that during the fermentation process, the knowledge of the sun is embedded into the potion, creating the "elixir of the sun."

== See also ==
- List of psychoactive plants
- List of hallucinogens
