= Spirit FM (Narrandera) =

Community radio station in Narrandera

Spirit FM (2NAR)
- Radio station logo

Narrandera; Australia
- Broadcast area: Narrandera RA1
- Frequency: 91.1 FM

Ownership
- Operator: Narrandera District Community Radio Inc.

History
- First air date: 27 January 2005

Technical information
- Licensing authority: ACMA
- ERP: 150W

Links
- Public licence information: Profile
- Website: www.ncradio.com.au

Spirit FM is a community radio station broadcasting to the town of Narrandera, Australia, which first aired in 2005. Programs are broadcast from a studio in the Narrandera railway station, and relayed to an FM transmitter on top of the water reservoir at the corner of Gordon Street and Broad Street.

== History ==
The idea for a local community radio station was first floated in 1985 by Jack Driscoll, former president of the Narrandera Shire Council. This was followed by multiple public meetings to gauge interest and establish Narrandera District Community Radio Inc, the organisation in charge of running the station.

Spirit FM began broadcasting on a temporary license on 27 January 2005. The station continued renewing this temporary license with the ACMA annually until 2010, when they were first granted a five-year permanent license.

The station started an online streaming service, alongside its FM broadcast, in 2018.

== Programming ==
A majority of the programs on Spirit FM are music oriented, each dedicated to a particular time frame or genre, for example, "Easy Listening" or "Best of 1990s". The station also has a number of programs with live on-air presenters, such as a morning breakfast program each weekday morning. Hourly news and sport bulletins produced by AIR News Media are broadcast each hour.

== See also ==
- List of radio stations in Australia
