= Petroleum ether =

Mixture of alkanes from oil

Names
- Other names Benzine; Light ligroin; Light petroleum; pether

Identifiers
CAS Number	8032-32-4; 8030-30-6
ChemSpider	none
ECHA InfoCard	100.029.498
EC Number	232-453-7
UNII	5OQ4BMR99T; O3L624621X
CompTox Dashboard (EPA)	DTXSID5027699

Properties
Molar mass	82.2 g/mol
Appearance	Volatile, clear, colorless and non-fluorescent liquid
Density	0.653 g/mL
Melting point	< −73 °C (−99 °F; 200 K)
Boiling point	42–62 °C (108–144 °F; 315–335 K)
Solubility in water	insoluble
Solubility in Ethanol	soluble
Vapor pressure	31 kPa (20 °C)
Refractive index (n_{D})	1.370
Viscosity	0.46 mPa·s

Hazards
- GHS labelling
Pictograms	(GHS02: Flammable) (GHS07: Exclamation mark) (GHS08: Health hazard) (GHS09: Environmental hazard)
Signal word	Danger
Hazard statements	H225, H304, H315, H336, H411
Precautionary statements	P210, P243, P273, P301+P310, P301+P330+P331, P303+P361+P353, P403+P235
NFPA 704 (fire diamond)	2 4 0
Flash point	< 0 °C (32 °F; 273 K)
Autoignition temperature	246.11 °C (475.00 °F; 519.26 K)
Explosive limits	1.4–5.9 %
Threshold limit value (TLV)	300 ppm (1370 mg/m^{3}) 8 h TWA (TWA)
- Lethal dose or concentration (LD, LC)
LC_{50} (median concentration)	3400 ppm (rat, 4 h)
- NIOSH (US health exposure limits)
PEL (Permissible)	100 ppm (400 mg/m^{3}) 8 h TWA
REL (Recommended)	100 ppm (400 mg/m^{3}) 10 h TWA
IDLH (Immediate danger)	1000 ppm

Related compounds
Related compounds	Ligroin, Petroleum benzine, Petroleum spirit, Stoddard solvent, Naphtha, White spirit
- Except where otherwise noted, data are given for materials in their standard state (at 25 °C [77 °F], 100 kPa). Infobox references

Petroleum ether is the petroleum fraction consisting of aliphatic hydrocarbons and boiling in the range 35–60 °C, and commonly used as a laboratory solvent. Despite the name, petroleum ether is not an ether.

== Properties ==
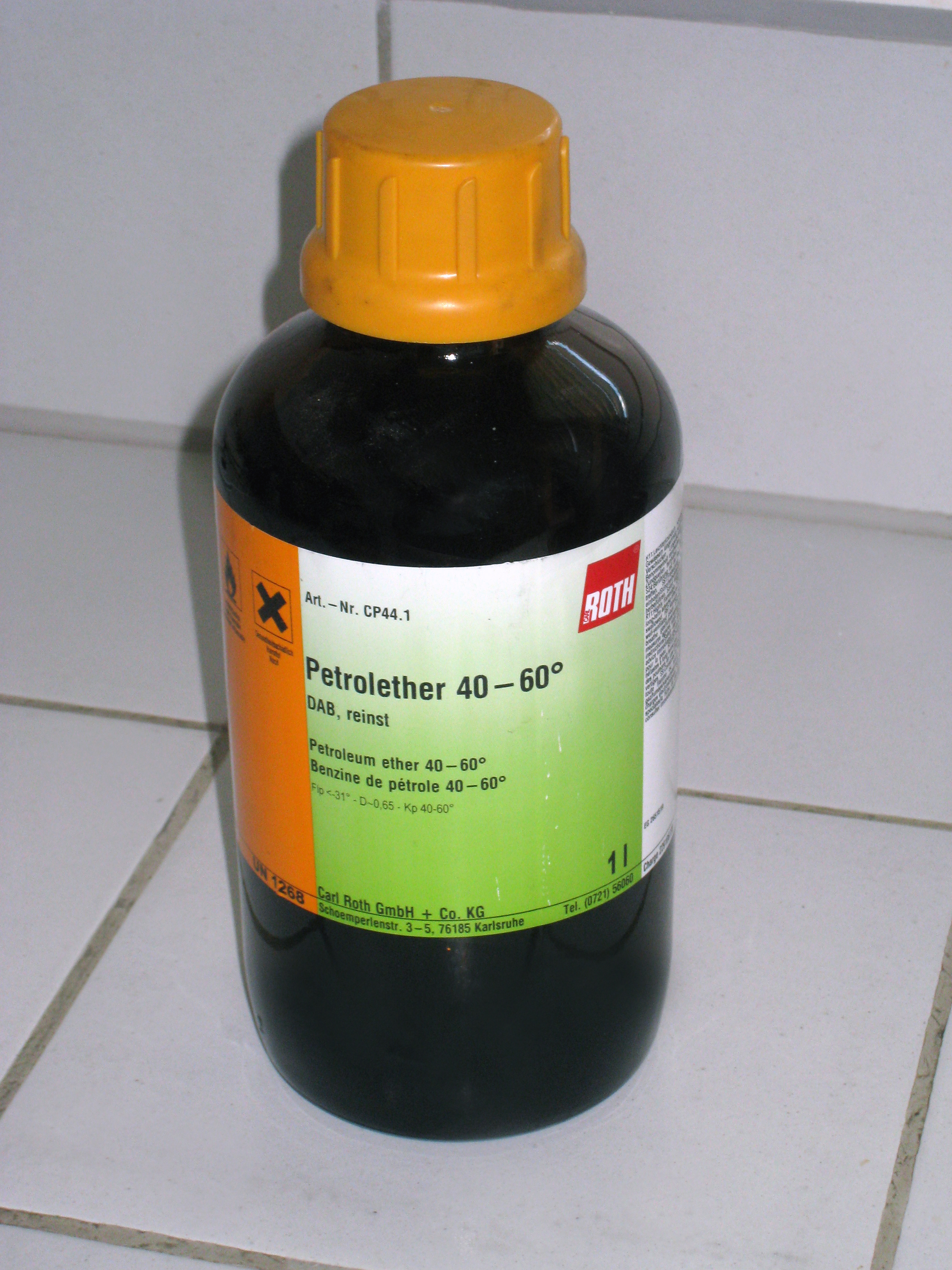
litre bottle

Petroleum ether consists mainly of aliphatic hydrocarbons and is usually low in aromatics. It is commonly hydrodesulfurized and may be hydrogenated to reduce the amount of aromatic and other unsaturated hydrocarbons.

== Standards ==
DIN 51630 has an initial boiling point above 25 °C, and its final boiling point up to 80 °C.

== Safety ==
Fires should be fought with foam, carbon dioxide, dry chemical or carbon tetrachloride.

The naphtha mixtures that are distilled at a lower boiling temperature have a higher volatility and, generally speaking, a higher degree of toxicity than the higher boiling fractions.

Inhalation overexposure causes primarily central nervous system (CNS) effects (headaches, dizziness, nausea, fatigue, and incoordination). In general, the toxicity is more pronounced with petroleum ethers containing higher concentrations of aromatic compounds. n-Hexane causes axonal damage in peripheral nerves.

Skin contact can cause allergic contact dermatitis.

Petroleum-derived distillates have not been shown to be carcinogenic in humans. Petroleum ether degrades rapidly in soil and water.
