= Magic truffle =

Hallucinogenic mushroom preparation

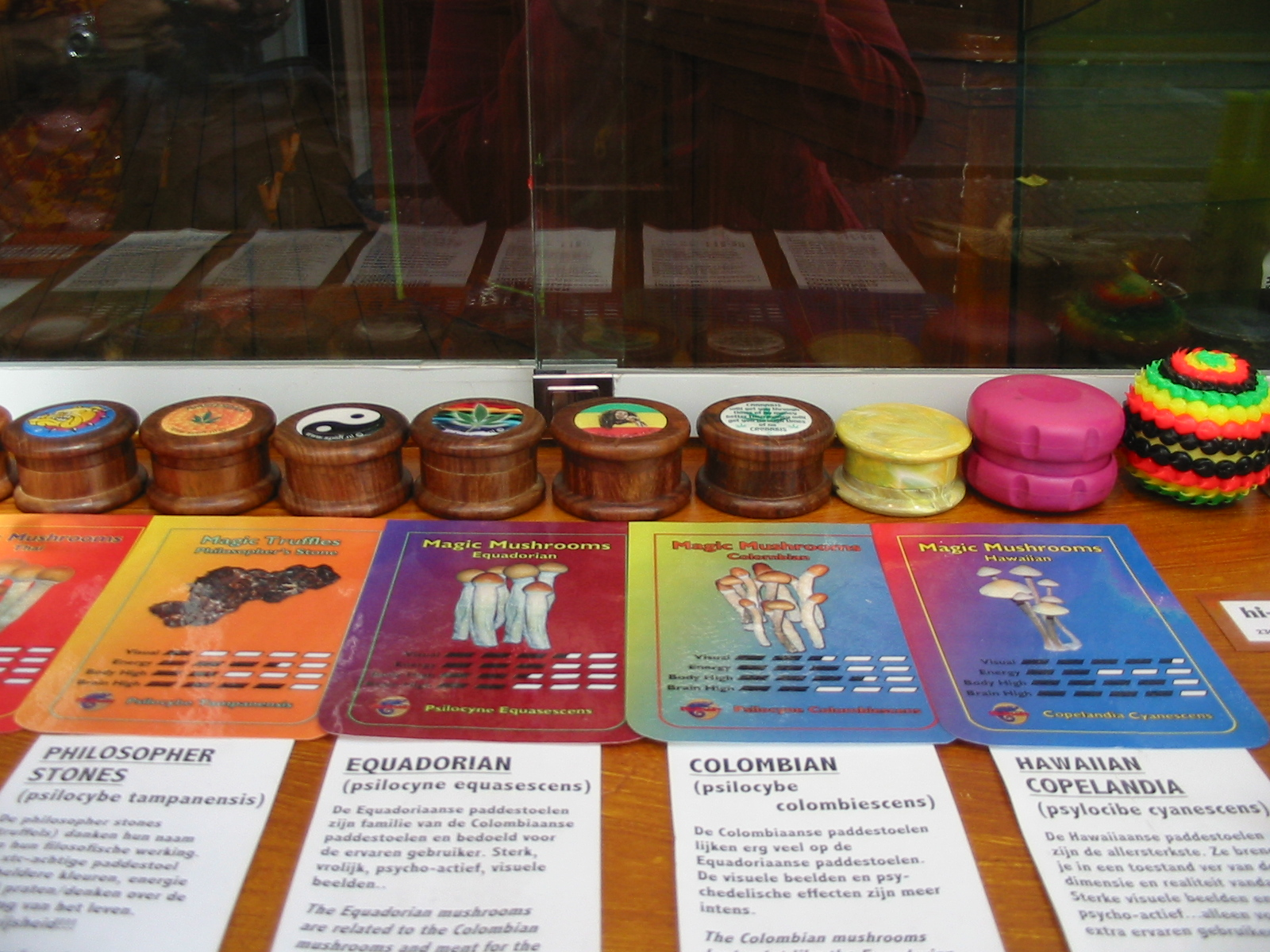
A Dutch Smart Shop with magic mushrooms and magic truffles on display in 2007

Magic truffles are the sclerotia of psilocybin mushrooms that are not technically the same as "mushrooms". They are masses of mycelium that contain the fruiting body which contains the hallucinogenic chemicals psilocybin and psilocin.

In October 2007, the prohibition of psychedelic or "magic mushrooms" was announced by the Dutch authorities. The ban on mushrooms did not outlaw the hallucinogenic species in sclerotium form, due to authorities believing it to be weaker than the mushrooms. Psilocybin truffles which once made little sales became the only legal option to produce. Today, smart shops in the Netherlands offer magic truffles as a legal alternative to the outlawed mushrooms.

== Addiction and tolerance ==
Physical addiction to magic truffles has never been documented. As the psychoactive constituent of magic truffles is psilocybin, the prodrug to psilocin, addiction is not possible by conventional definitions. Additionally, there is strong evidence to suggest there is little to no potential for psychological dependence on psilocybin.

Tolerance to magic truffles specifically is not well researched. However, tolerance to psilocybin is a well understood concept, with repeatedly higher doses being needed in order to achieve the same effect, due to the down regulation of 5HT2A receptors. There is also documented cross-tolerance between psilocybin and LSD, meaning that a higher dose of these substances is needed to get the same effect when a person consumes them with high frequency. Through temporary abstinence the tolerance returns to baseline.

== Species ==
There are five different types of truffles:

- Psilocybe atlantis
- Psilocybe galindoi
- Psilocybe mexicana (Jalisco/Mexicana A)
- Psilocybe pajaritos
- Psilocybe tampanensis

== See also ==
- Drug policy of the Netherlands
- Mushroom edible
- Mushroom tea
- Psychedelic mushroom store
