= Akasha Song =

American drug trafficker

- Born: February 9, 1978
- Died: August 5, 2025 (aged 47); Miami, Florida, U.S.
- Other names: Joseph Clements; Shimshai
- Years active: 2013–2022
- Known for: Manufacture and sale of dimethyltryptamine (DMT)

Akasha Song (February 9, 1978 – August 5, 2025), also known by his legal name Joseph Clements and by his previous online vendor handle Shimshai, was an American former seller of the psychedelic drug dimethyltryptamine (DMT) who operated on the dark web. He operated by importing Mimosa tenuiflora (jurema) tree bark from countries like Mexico and Brazil, extracting DMT from the bark, and then selling the DMT on the dark web. Song gradually scaled up his operation and was said by the United States federal government to have at one point been the largest illicit DMT producer and seller in history.

Song first learned how to extract DMT from the tree bark around 2013. He started selling DMT on AlphaBay in 2015 and soon became the top seller of DMT on the site. In 2017, when AlphaBay was taken down, Song switched to selling DMT on other dark-web markets, including Hansa, Wall Street Market, and Dream Market. Starting out extracting DMT by himself and working as a drug dealer selling DMT to people in-person, Song eventually set up multiple self-operating clandestine DMT extraction labs and made millions or billions of dollars in profit on the dark web. At its peak, Song's operation was producing 5 kg of DMT every 3 days, or as much as a million doses of DMT per month. He mass-produced and sold both DMT powder and vape pens.

In 2018, one of Song's self-operating DMT extraction labs exploded. Evidence of his operation was destroyed by the fire and it narrowly escaped detection. Song then proceeded to set up a new lab. In April 2022, Song was arrested by Department of Homeland Security agents who had been investigating him for years. In February 2023, he was convicted and sentenced to 24 months in prison, ultimately serving 16 months and being released on probation. Shortly prior to this, the state of Colorado, where Song was being tried, had decriminalized psychedelic drugs, making it no longer a crime to own or use psychedelics. Although it was still a crime to sell psychedelics, this development influenced the demeanor of Song's criminal case and resulted in him receiving a relatively light sentence. Song's story was featured in a long Wired exposé in May 2025.

Song died on August 5, 2025 at the age of 47 a few weeks following an automobile accident.

== See also ==
- Online illicit drug vendor
- Casey William Hardison
- Hamilton Morris
- William Leonard Pickard
- Nicholas Sand
- Tim Scully
- Owsley Stanley
- Ross Ulbricht
- Lizard Labs
