= Shroom House =

Shop in Portland, Oregon, U.S.

Coordinates: 45.523018°N 122.686956°W

Shroom House is a pair of shops which have sold psychedelic mushrooms illegally in Vancouver, British Columbia, Canada, as well as Portland, Oregon, United States.

== Portland, Oregon ==
The business, operating on West Burnside Street beginning on October 24, 2022, was not licensed. Fox Business described Shroom House as an "herbal wellness shop". Elise Haas of KOIN wrote, "Even though the Oregon Health Authority and police say this is not legal, the long lines seen outside the store show the simple economics of supply and demand." In 2020, Oregon voters approved Ballot Measure 109, which allowed for the administration of psilocybin, but did not authorize it in a retail setting like Shroom House. Customers were required to fill out an application to the "Shroom House Society" when purchasing items.

On December 8, 2022, the Portland Police Bureau raided Shroom House and seized "a large amount of suspected psilocybin products" and $13,000 in cash. Four arrests were made on felony charges. The shop's owner pleaded not guilty to 40 felony charges.

== See also ==
- 2020 Oregon Ballot Measure 109
- Legal status of psilocybin mushrooms
- Psilocybin decriminalization in the United States
- Psychedelic mushroom store
