= Dream Market =

Online black market

- Website type: Darknet market
- Available in: English
- Owners: SpeedStepper, later identified as Owe Martin Andresen
- Commercial: Yes
- Registration: Required
- Launched: November/December 2013
- Current status: Offline since April 2019

Dream Market was an online darknet market founded in late 2013. Dream Market operated on a hidden service of the Tor network, allowing online users to browse anonymously and securely while avoiding potential monitoring of traffic. The marketplace sold a variety of content, including drugs, stolen data, and counterfeit consumer goods, all using cryptocurrency. Dream provided an escrow service, with disputes handled by staff. The market also had accompanying forums, hosted on a different URL, where buyers, vendors, and other members of the community could interact. It was one of the longest running darknet markets.

Administrator and prolific vendor Gal Vallerius was arrested in August 2017. The site shut down on April 30, 2019.

== History ==
Following the seizures and shutdowns of the AlphaBay and Hansa markets in July 2017 as part of Operation Bayonet, there was much speculation that Dream Market would become the predominant darknet marketplace. Formerly, Dream Market had been considered the second-largest darknet marketplace, with AlphaBay being the largest and Hansa the third-largest. Many vendors and buyers from AlphaBay and Hansa communities registered on Dream Market in the aftermath of Operation Bayonet. Rumors at the time suggested that Dream Market was under law enforcement control.

At the time, Dream Market was reported to have "57,000 listings for drugs and 4,000 listings for opioids".

Dream Market administrator and prolific vendor Gal Vallerius was arrested in August 2017, after a border search of his laptop confirmed his identity as online drug dealer OxyMonster. The equivalent of US$500,000 in the cryptocurrency Bitcoin was also discovered on this device. Vallerius is the subject of an ongoing investigation regarding large online narcotics purchases which began in February 2016.

On March 24, 2019, a banner was added to the Dream Market site announcing its shutdown on April 30, 2019, with the addition that it "is transferring its services to a partner company" followed by an .onion link. Some users believe this to be the owner's reaction to ongoing distributed denial-of-service attacks while others doubt the credibility of the message and suspect a connection to law enforcement, scammers or competing marketplaces.

=== Arrests of Owe Martin Andresen ===
Owe Martin Andresen, a 49-year-old German National, was arrested in Germany for charges of money laundering. He is accused of being the main administrator of Dream Market SpeedStepper.

== Security issues ==
Shortly after the recent seizures of other markets, the accounts of a number of Dream Market vendors came under the control of Dutch law enforcement. Since no official statement has been released by Dutch authorities regarding this matter, it is unclear how these accounts were compromised, though some researchers suggest that shared credentials are to blame.

On September 13, 2017, Dream users reported the loss of funds from their accounts in posts to forums such as Reddit. In a post to the market's news page, staff later confirmed that a hard drive loss caused the issue and promised to refund the lost funds.

== See also ==
- Online illicit drug vendor
