= Operation SpecTor =

Operation to take down a darknet market

Monopoly Market
- Website type: Darknet market
- Available in: English
- Owner: Milomir Desnica
- Industry: Drug Trade
- Revenue: ~€1.23 billion
- Commercial: Yes
- Registration: None
- Launched: 2019
- Current status: Shut down

Operation SpecTor was an operation coordinated by Europol, which involved nine countries, including the United States, Austria, France, Germany, and the Netherlands to disrupt fentanyl and opioid distribution. The operation targeted and took down the darknet market "Monopoly Market."

== Monopoly Market ==
Monopoly Market was a darknet market operating from 2019 to 2021, the target of the SpecTor operation, which did not require registration or depositing to an internal cryptocurrency wallet, and only accepted Monero. The market was discovered to be owned by Milomir Desnica, as a result of the operation, and had an estimated revenue of €1.23 billion.

== History ==
2019 Monopoly Market is launched by Milomir Desnica

2021 Monopoly Market is shut down under the SpecTor operation, by German law enforcement

May 2023 288 vendors are arrested, in connection to Monopoly Market, and Milomir Desnica is extradited from Austria. Europol confirms Monopoly Market was shut down by German law enforcement.

Nov 2023 Milomir Desnica pleads guilty to running Monopoly Market

== Results ==
On May 2, 2023, both the Department of Justice and Europol released the results of Operation SpecTor. In the United States, the Department of Justice's J-CODE team (with international partners) introduced the results of SpecTor, which was a monumental success, ranking the most arrests ever for any J-CODE operation. Operation SpecTor resulted in the arrest of 288 vendors who sold drugs and other various items, as well as the seizure of $53 million, 850 kg of drugs, and 117 guns. The operation also resulted the extradition of the owner, Milomir Desnica, from Austria. Europol announced, in addition, that the German police had taken down Monopoly Market in late 2021. The unexpected shutdown, due to no explanation from administrators of Monopoly, or government agencies, left many users to come to the conclusions that the administrators performed an exit scam.

== Assistance ==
Operation SpecTor likely included assistance from intel on several other darknet markets, and the assistance of German law enforcement agencies, who had access to Monopoly Market infrastructure, and resulted in the shutdown of Monopoly, under the SpecTor operation, back in 2021.

== See also ==
Darknet market
