= Drug policy of Poland =

The drug policy of Poland traces its origin to the 1920s.

In the Second Polish Republic, the 1923 Act introduced criminalization of the production, processing, export, import, storage or marketing of a number of narcotic drugs listed therein, authorizing the Minister of Health to expand their list if necessary. The threatened penalty was imprisonment for up to 5 years and a fine or one of these penalties. Polish Penal Code of 1932 in art. 244, stated that a person giving another person an intoxicating poison without authorization was liable to imprisonment for up to 5 years of impironment.

In the Polish People's Republic, the phenomenon of drug addiction was ignored by the authorities for a long time due to the propaganda line that it was a problem that plagued only capitalist countries. It was only in the 1980s that drug addiction began to be treated as a serious social problem (among other things, in order to highlight the mistakes of the Edward Gierek government's policy, which its successors tried to blame for various problems) and appeared in the public debate, which resulted in the adoption of the first act in Poland on January 31, 1985, on counteracting drug addiction. It adopted a preventive and therapeutic model for preventing drug addiction, without criminalizing, for example, possession of controlled substances. For providing, inducing or facilitating use for the purpose of material or personal gain, the law threatened imprisonment for up to 10 years (Article 32).

After the fall of communism in Poland, the changes in Poland in the 1990s also influenced the nature of the drug scene, leading to the adoption of a new act on counteracting drug addiction on April 24, 1997. In addition to other changes (increased liability in the event of providing funds to a minor in Article 46), it regulated the issue of substitution treatment and criminalized the possession of controlled substances, with the exception of small amounts intended for personal use. This exception for small quantities was not included in the subsequent version of the law in October 2000. Assessment of the effects of criminalizing drug possession for personal use is the subject of public debate.

The currently applicable Act on Counteracting Drug Addiction was passed in 2005. In Art. 59, it maintains stricter liability for providing narcotics to a minor.

In 2010, the concept of substitute measures was introduced into the Act, criticized by many lawyers as imprecise, in order to combat the designer drugs.

The 2011 amendment to the Act introduced a provision that allows the prosecutor's office to discontinue proceedings in the event of possession of small amounts of drugs for personal use. It also obliged the prosecutor's office to collect information about the suspect's addiction. This amendment was positively assessed in its report in 2014 by the Helsinki Foundation for Human Rights.

== See also ==
- October 2010 raid on smart drug shops in Poland
- Polish heroin
