= Judd Weiss =

American businessman

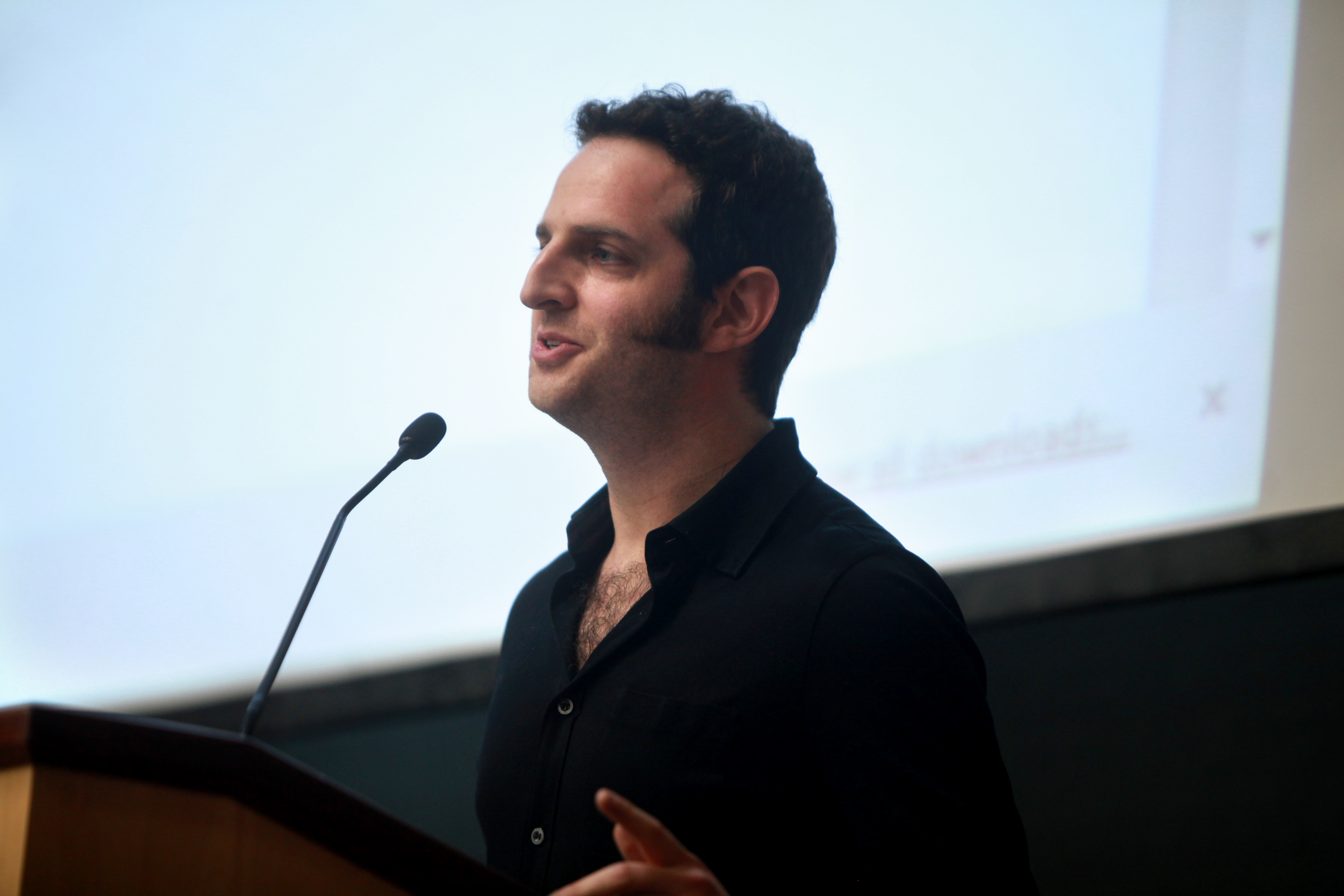
- Weiss in 2014
- Born: July 24, 1980 (age 46)
- Occupations: Businessman, entrepreneur, former political candidate
- Years active: 2000s–present
- Organization(s): Libertarian Party and various companies
- Known for: Running for Libertarian vice presidential nomination in 2016, various companies

Judd Weiss is an American businessman, entrepreneur, and former political candidate. He was John McAfee's vice presidential candidate for the Libertarian Party nomination in the 2016 United States presidential election. Weiss is also known for running various companies, including legal recreational drug companies such as Lit.Club, Advanced Mycology, and Voyager Labs.

== Earlier life ==
In his early life, Weiss once worked at Cold Stone Creamery and has disclosed that he was once an LSD dealer. Subsequently, he made a fortune in real estate in Los Angeles in his 20s.

== 2012 sexual assault allegations ==
Weiss was arrested for alleged felony sexual assault and rape in 2012. His case went to trial but ended in a hung jury and prosecutors then pursued a second trial. However, Weiss negotiated with prosecutors and agreed to instead plead no contest to charges of false imprisonment with the other charges dropped. As a result, he avoided a second trial and received only a misdemeanor for false imprisonment as well as probation and counseling. Weiss has publicly denied the sexual assault and other allegations, maintaining that he was falsely accused.

== 2016 Libertarian vice-presidential campaign ==
John McAfee ran for President in the United States in 2016, seeking the Libertarian Party's nomination. Weiss was his selected Vice President candidate. Previously, Weiss had been an artistic photographer for the Libertarian movement and a longtime Libertarian activist. McAfee was referred to in the media as the "Libertarian Trump" and the pair's candidacy was considered a longshot. McAfee ended up coming in third place for the Libertarian Party nomination, with Gary Johnson winning the nomination.

== Legal recreational drug companies ==
Weiss has had companies in the United States including the cannabis company Lit.Club in 2018 and the psilocybin mushroom-related company Advanced Mycology in the 2020s. Advanced Mycology partnered with Mike Tyson for a product called Mikeadelics in 2024.

=== Voyager Labs ===
Mushroom edibles containing the unscheduled designer psychedelic and psilocin prodrug 4-AcO-DMT (psilacetin; O-acetylpsilocin) started to surge in the United States as an alternative to illegal psilocybin, psilocin, and psilocybin-containing mushrooms in the early 2020s. By the mid-2020s, Weiss launched a new company called Voyager Labs selling other unscheduled and hence legal designer psychedelics and related drugs in the United States. This company specifically sells the unscheduled psychedelics 4-HO-MET (metocin; Xüm, Xüm Clear), methylethyltryptamine (MET; Xüm Spirit), and 4-HO-MiPT (miprocin; Xüm Deep Transcend), which are all close psilocin analogues, as well as the entactogen 5-MAPB (Plür).

According to Weiss, the United States Federal Analogue Act, which states that analogues of Schedule I controlled substances are themselves illegal, is "effectively dead", and he is unconcerned about the law with regard to his business operations. This was based on past critiques by Supreme Court justice Neil Gorsuch of the law being too vague and on notions that the Drug Enforcement Administration (DEA) is preoccupied with more dangerous drugs like fentanyl. Nonetheless, Weiss says that he is prepared for the DEA to try and intervene with his operations and is ready to legally fight this in the courts. In other areas, Weiss has criticized the unregulated legal psychedelic drug industry in the United States due to mislabeling concerns, for instance unclear "proprietary mushroom blend" labeling, whereas he touts his own products as having fully transparent labeling. Relatedly, a mushroom edible brand called Diamond Shruumz was linked to hundreds of poisonings in the United States 2024. Weiss has presented Voyager Labs and its products at various trade shows. He was interviewed by journalist Hamilton Morris about his endeavors in 2026.

== See also ==
- 2016 Libertarian Party presidential primaries
- Online drug vendor
- Psychedelic mushroom store
