= Online illicit drug vendor =

Online vendor that sells illicit drugs

An online illicit drug vendor is an online vendor that sells illicit drugs. They are known to sell illicit drugs including recreational psychoactive drugs and performance-enhancing drugs (PEDs), among others. Online illicit drug vendors are known to operate both on the dark web and on the clear web. They may sell explicitly illegal controlled substances or may sell legal designer drugs. Hundreds of online illicit drug vendors are known to exist. They have been described by experts as a concerningly accessible, easy, and inexpensive way of obtaining drugs.

== Types of drugs ==
Examples of illicit drugs that may be sold by online drug vendors include recreational psychoactive drugs like stimulants, depressants, cannabinoids, hallucinogens, and entactogens; controlled pharmaceutical drugs like stimulants and sedatives or hypnotics; and performance-enhancing drugs (PEDs) like anabolic steroids and selective androgen receptor modulators (SARMs). So-called "nootropics" ("cognitive enhancers") may also be sold.

== Designer drugs ==
Online vendors often sell designer drugs, also known as "novel psychoactive substances" (NPS) or "legal highs", which are analogues of controlled substances that are not yet themselves explicitly controlled and that are legal or exist in a legal grey area. An example is the stimulant and entactogen mephedrone (4-MMC), a previously uncontrolled analogue of methamphetamine and MDMA (ecstasy) that emerged in the late 2000s and was subsequently banned. The use of designer drugs known as prodrugs is also a notable way by which even otherwise illegal drugs can be sold in a legal manner by online clearnet vendors. Designer drugs are often sold as "research chemicals" (RCs) and labeled as being "for research use only" and "not for human consumption". They may alternatively be labeled for other uses such as use as "bath salts" or "plant food".

Designer drugs rapidly emerged in the early- to mid-2000s and have dramatically increased over time, with more than 700 novel designer drugs having been encountered by the late 2010s. Novel designer drugs can be created and sold very rapidly, and there is an almost infinite number of designer drugs that could be made, which has made them difficult for authorities to legally control. Some countries have enacted blanket bans on illicit drug analogues, for instance the United States's 1986 Federal Analogue Act (FAA). However, this particular law has been critiqued as unconstitutionally vague, has been difficult to practically enforce, and has been regarded by some as being effectively void. Moreover, the law is written such that it only applies to compounds explicitly described by sellers as "intended for human consumption", which has provided an easy legal loophole for vendors to circumvent the law simply by avoiding such descriptions. Such limitations have led to calls for this law to be updated and reformed.

== Operations ==
The drugs sold by online illicit drug vendors originate from clandestine chemistry labs, either based locally or imported from other countries like China, India, and the Netherlands. The vendors are unregulated, and the substances in such products often vary widely from labeled quantities. They may or may not actually contain the described ingredient in question, or may contain a mixture of substances. Supposedly legal designer drug products may often even contain controlled substances instead. Cryptocurrency payment methods such as bitcoin are frequently used by online illicit drug vendors to facilitate payment transactions. Street drug dealers are sometimes known to purchase illicit drugs online and then resell them at a higher price to customers in-person. Law enforcement and government agencies are well-known to actively monitor and raid online drug vendors.

== Notable examples ==
A notable large online market of illicit drug vendors was the darknet market Silk Road, which was created and operated by Ross Ulbricht (Dread Pirate Roberts) in 2011 and was shut down by law enforcement in 2013. Shimshai (Akasha Song or Joseph Clements) was a major vendor of the psychedelic drug dimethyltryptamine (DMT) on subsequent darknet markets such as AlphaBay, Hansa, and Dream Market who operated from 2015 to 2022 before being apprehended by law enforcement. Lizard Labs was a developer and vendor of legal designer drugs such as LSD prodrugs like 1P-LSD and 1V-LSD that operated on the clear web from 2012 to 2024 before shutting down due to increasing legal pressure. Nootropics Depot sold non-approved pharmaceutical drugs as nootropics in the United States before being prosecuted and sentenced in 2023 and 2024. Voyager Labs by Judd Weiss launched in the mid-2020s and is openly selling unscheduled and hence legal psychedelics like 4-HO-MET (metocin; Xüm) and entactogens like 5-MAPB (Plür) in the United States without being concerned about the Federal Analogue Act.

== See also ==
- Illegal drug trade
- Online pharmacy
- Smart shop
- Cannabis retail outlet
- Psychedelic mushroom store
- Judd Weiss
