= Operation DRYER =

- Duration: March 21, 2018
- Type: Law enforcement
- Arrests: 40

Operation DRYER is a joint operation between the Spanish Civil Guard, Austrian police, and Europol working to shut down labs and organizations which produce designer drugs. Authorities seized over 4.5 million euros' worth of cryptocurrency, as well as 788,606 doses of LSD; these are the largest seizures of cryptocurrency and LSD in European history. The operation was revealed to the public on June 28, 2018.

== Background ==
A designer drug is a structural or functional analog of a controlled substance that has been designed to mimic the pharmacological effects of the original drug, while avoiding classification as illegal and/or detection in standard drug tests. These drugs have been designated by the European Union as new psychoactive substances (NPS).

In 2005 the American Drug Enforcement Administration (DEA) conducted Operation Web Tryp to shut down US based designer drug vendors.

On March 21, 2018, several drug vendor sourcing subreddits were shut down, including /r/RCSources and /r/DarkNetMarkets.

On June 27, 2018 (one day before the public reveal of Operation DRYER) it was reported that US Homeland Security special agents concluded an undercover operation to shut down darknet vendors; they arrested over 40 people and seized more than $20 million in guns, drugs, cars, gold, and cryptocurrency. This operation may or may not be connected to Operation DRYER.

== Details ==
The investigation began in 2015, with the interception of a package in Hof (Bavaria) by the German police, containing several designer drugs substances. The shipment, from a post office box in Ogijares (Granada), pointed to the existence of a criminal structure based in that Spanish province. Investigators detected a large number of packages and postal envelopes being sent from Ogijares to more than 100 countries of all continents, with the exception of Africa.

The criminal network began operating in 2012 and initially imported the precursors for the designer drugs from China. After China increased criminal penalties for the production of designer drugs, the criminal network installed a laboratory in Amsterdam, and two chemical engineers were hired to synthesize the designer drugs. Numerous laboratory grade materials were found such as chromatographs, crushing machines and other equipment used for drug analysis and production. Later, laboratories were set up in Alhendín and in La Pobla de Vallbona.

On March 7 all members of the operation were arrested, consisting of eight people of Spanish, Austrian, and French nationality. Seven of these people were part of the same Spanish family, with the exception of one Frenchman.

The value of the remaining substances found in the laboratories is estimated to be 12 million euros. Authorities seized 509 bitcoins (worth at the time 4.5 million euros), as well as 167,000 euros of other cryptocurrencies. This is the largest seizure of cryptocurrency in Europe ever.

Also seized were numerous bank accounts containing a total of 2 million euros; 3 real estate properties worth altogether 1 million euros; 10 luxury vehicles; and more than 650,000 euros in cash. 700,000 euros was laundered through Hawala networks. In total the organization is estimated to have laundered more than 40 million euros.

== Substances found ==
More than 100 substances were produced at the lab, including synthetic cannabinoids, depressants, dissociatives, stimulants such as amphetamines and cathinones, nootropics, psychedelics and opioids.

788,606 doses of LSD were located in the Valencia laboratory, making this the largest seizure of LSD in Europe ever.

== See also ==
- Operation Web Tryp
- Designer drug
- October 2010 raid on smart drug shops in Poland
