= Operation Bayonet =

Operation Bayonet may refer to:

- Another name for Mossad assassinations following the Munich massacre, a 1972 covert operation directed by the Mossad to assassinate individuals involved in the Munich massacre of that year
- Operation Bayonet (darknet), a multinational law enforcement operation culminating in 2017, targeting the AlphaBay and Hansa darknet markets
