= Operation Dark HunTor =

Multinational operation against opioid trafficking

- Operation name: Operation Dark HunTor
- Type: Drug Enforcement

Participants
- Executed by: Bulgaria, France, Germany, Italy, Netherlands, Switzerland, United Kingdom, United States
- No. of countries participating: 12

Mission
- Target: Dark Markets: Dream, Wallstreet, White House, DeepSea, Berlusconi, Dark Market
- Objective: To disrupt opioid trafficking and other illegal activities occurring through the Onion Service "Dark Market" with the goal to hunt down the vendors, buyers, and suppliers who had been hiding on that site and make sure they did not find a new platform

Timeline
- Date executed: January 2021

Results
- Arrests: 151

Operation Dark HunTOR was an international law enforcement operation targeting opioid trafficking and other illegal activities on the Tor network. The operation was conducted across the United States, Australia, and Europe over a period of 10 months. In addition Europol released a statement that said the operation was composed of a series of separate but complementary actions in Australia, Bulgaria, France, Germany, Italy, the Netherlands, Switzerland, the United Kingdom and the United States, with coordination efforts led by Europol and Eurojust; which greatly expands on the initial number of countries that the US press releases indicated.

The name of the operation is a portmanteau of "hunt" or "hunter" and Tor, a free overlay network that is often used to access the dark web.

== Methodology ==
According to US court documents a "variety" of methods were used to corroborate the trafficking of drugs through the USPS mail system. One such method was "controlled buys" of drugs from dark market sites and then working to trace sales back to the source mail box.

While many Tor-related multinational coordinated operations have relied on sophisticated technological attacks, malware and hacking on the part of the government, review of these cases have yet to reveal a technological method used to deanonymize any users of dark markets.

The methods remain of extreme interest to the civil rights and cyber community as to the methodology that used by the various agencies to identify the location of the server or the users. Without an undercover agent tricking the users into giving up their protected information, or sloppy information management once again on behalf of the perpetrators few methods are available when all that is trafficked is data and not physical objects that must be transported physically and not electronically.

== Legality ==
The U.S. Government and other partnering governments have been secretive in their transparency regarding this operation. U.S. law enforcement agencies as do other national agencies have some restrictions on what they are allowed to do outside the nations borders, especially without judicial or legislative approval. Additionally, law enforcement agencies generally require an agreement in the form of a Mutual legal assistance treaty (MLAT) or Memorandum of Understanding (MOU) to operate in any specific country other than their own granting special permissions. Any public release, review or audit of the MLATs or MOUs associated with this operation remain unpublished as of 1/2024.

== Results ==
- The arrest of 151 alleged Darknet drug traffickers and other criminals across several countries, including Australia, Bulgaria, France, Germany, Italy, the Netherlands, Switzerland, the United Kingdom, and the United States.
- Seizures amounting to over $31.6 million in cash and virtual currencies.
- Approximately 234 kilograms of drugs were confiscated globally, including significant quantities of amphetamines, cocaine, opioids, MDMA, and other drugs, as well as counterfeit medicines.
- The seizure of 45 firearms.
- The operation involved identifying Darknet vendor accounts and linking them to real individuals involved in illegal activities across both active and inactive Darknet Marketplaces, such as Dream, WallStreet, White House, DeepSea, Berlusconi, and Dark Market.

=== Country-specific results ===
- Bulgaria – 1 arrest
- France – 3 arrests
- Germany – 47 arrests
- Netherlands – 4 arrests
- United Kingdom – 24 arrests
- Italy – 4 arrests
- Switzerland – 2 arrests
- United States – 65 arrests

== Participating law enforcement agencies ==
- United States Joint Criminal Opioid and Darknet Enforcement (JCODE)
  - Homeland Security Investigations (HSI)
  - Federal Bureau of Investigation (FBI)
  - Drug Enforcement Administration (DEA)
  - U.S. Postal Inspection Service (USPIS)
  - IRS Criminal Investigation (IRS-CI)
  - Bureau of Alcohol, Tobacco, Firearms and Explosives (ATF)
  - Food and Drug Administration (FDA)
  - Naval Criminal Investigative Service (NCIS)
  - U.S. Customs and Border Protection (CBP)
  - Department of Justice's
    - Organized Crime Drug Enforcement Task Force (OCDETF)
    - National Cyber Investigative Joint Task Force (NCJITF)
  - Financial Crimes Enforcement Network* (FinCEN)
- Europol – European Cybercrime Centre (EC3)
- Eurojust
- Australia – Australian Federal Police (AFP)
- Bulgaria – Bulgaria's General Directorate Combating Organized Crime – Главна дирекция Борба с организираната престъпност(GDBOP)
- France:
  - French National Police – Police National – (OCLCTIC)
  - National Gendarmerie – French Gendarmerie Nationale – (C3N)
- Germany
  - Federal Criminal Police Office (Germany) Bundeskriminalamt (BKA)
  - Central Criminal Investigation Department in the German city of Oldenburg – Zentrale KriminaIinspektion Oldenburg
  - State Criminal Police Offices (Germany) – Landeskriminalämter
  - State Criminal Police Office of Lower Saxony – Niedersachsen- (LKA)
  - German Investigation Customs – Zollfahndungsämter
- Italy:
  - The Italian Finance Corps Guardia di Finanza
  - Public Prosecutor's Office Brescia
- Netherlands – Netherlands' National Police – Politie
- Switzerland:
  - Zurich Canton Police – Kantonspolizei Zürich
  - Public Prosecutor's Office II of the Canton of Zurich – Staatsanwaltschaft II
- United Kingdom – National Crime Agency (NCA) and NPCC

* indicates a non governmental organization

== See also ==
- Operation DisrupTor
- Operation Bayonet (darknet)
