= Operation DisrupTor =

Multinational operation against opioid trafficking

- Operation name: Operation DisrupTor
- Type: Drug Enforcement

Participants
- Planned by: U.S. FBI, U.S. DEA, U.S. ICE, U.S SS, U.S. USPIS, U.S. IRSCI, U.S. ATF
- Executed by: United States, Canada, Europol

Mission
- Target: Dark Web Drug Traffickers

Timeline
- Date executed: ≈2020

Results
- Arrests: 179
- Miscellaneous results: Seizures: $6.5Million Cash and Digital currency, 500kg drugs

Operation DisrupTor was an international investigation targeting drug traffickers on the dark web. Coordinated by the Joint Criminal Opioid and Darknet Enforcement, the operation was initiated and managed by the Federal Bureau of Investigation. The operation also included assistance from the Drug Enforcement Administration, U.S. Immigration and Customs Enforcement, United States Secret Service, United States Postal Inspection Service, IRS Criminal Investigation, Bureau of Alcohol, Tobacco, Firearms and Explosives, and local law enforcement agencies.

The operation was announced on September 22, 2020 by Deputy Attorney General Jeffrey A. Rosen at a joint press conference. The name of the operation is a portmanteau of "disrupt" and Tor, an open-source anonymity network that is often used to access the dark web.

== Results ==
The investigation resulted in 179 arrests worldwide, in addition to 6.5 million dollars in seized funds (including digital currency) and 500 kilograms of drugs.

=== Country-specific results ===
- Canada & Europe - 50 Arrests
- United States - 120 Arrests

== Participating law enforcement agencies ==
- Canada
- Europol
- United States Joint Criminal Opioid and Darknet Enforcement (JCODE)
  - Homeland Security Investigations (HSI)
  - Federal Bureau of Investigation (FBI)
  - Drug Enforcement Administration (DEA)
  - U.S. Postal Inspection Service (USPIS)
  - IRS Criminal Investigation (IRS-CI)
  - Bureau of Alcohol, Tobacco, Firearms and Explosives (ATF)
  - U.S. Secret Service

== See also ==
- Operation Dark Huntor
