= R v Malmo-Levine; R v Caine =

- Supreme Court of Canada

Hearing: May 6, 2003 Judgment: December 23, 2003
- Full case name: David Malmo‑Levine v Her Majesty The Queen; Victor Eugene Caine v Her Majesty The Queen
- Citations: [2003] 3 S.C.R. 571, 2003 SCC 74
- Prior history: R. v. Malmo-Levine, [1998] B.C.J. No. 1025 (QL) (S.C.); R. v. Caine, [1998] B.C.J. No. 885 (QL)(Prov. Ct.); R. v. Malmo-Levine et al., 2000 BCCA 335
- Ruling: Appeal dismissed.

Holding
- Parliament is authorized to criminalize possession of marijuana. Criminalization of marijuana does not infringe on Section 7 rights in the Charter. The harm principle is not a fundamental principle of natural justice.

Court membership
- Chief Justice: Beverley McLachlin; Puisne Justices: Charles Gonthier, Frank Iacobucci, John C. Major, Michel Bastarache, Ian Binnie, Louise Arbour, Louis LeBel, Marie Deschamps

Reasons given
- Majority: Gonthier and Binnie JJ., joined by McLachlin C.J. and Iacobucci, Major and Bastarache JJ.
- Dissent: Arbour J. (in Caine)
- Dissent: LeBel J. (in Caine)
- Dissent: Deschamps J. (in Caine)

R v Malmo-Levine; R v Caine [2003] 3 S.C.R. 571, 2003 SCC 74, is a Supreme Court of Canada decision that Parliament had the authority to criminalize the possession and trafficking of marijuana, and that power did not infringe on the section 7 of the Canadian Charter of Rights and Freedoms.

The Court found the harm principle is not a fundamental aspect of natural justice in Canada relevant to section 7 of the Charter.

== Background ==
The decision involves two cases. The first was where David Malmo-Levine, a "marijuana/freedom activist", ran an organization in East Vancouver called the "Harm Reduction Club", which attempts to reduce the harm associated with marijuana use by educating users and the public about the drug and provide the drug at cost. In December 1996 the police raided the Harm Reduction Club and seized 316 grams of marijuana charging Malmo-Levine with possession for the purpose of trafficking.

The second case involved the 1993 arrest of Victor Caine for possession of marijuana. Caine was in his van by the ocean when two RCMP officers approached him. He was stopped and a 0.5 gram were found in his possession.

Both Caine and Malmo-Levine challenged the constitutionality of the criminalization of marijuana under the Narcotics Control Act.

Malmo-Levine's argument focused on whether there should be a requirement of harm for criminal law. He argued that the constitutional power to enact criminal law under section 91(27) of the Constitution Act, 1867 is limited to conduct that causes harm. He further argued that the "harm principle" should be a principle of fundamental justice under section 7 of the Canadian Charter of Rights and Freedoms.

== Supreme Court of Canada ==
Malmo-Levine and Caine appealed the decision of the British Columbia Court of Appeals to the Supreme Court of Canada which heard the case on May 6, 2003. On December 23, 2003, Justice Charles Gonthier and Ian Binnie jointly authored the majority decision.

=== Majority decision ===
Gonthier and Binnie JJ., writing the majority, rejected all the arguments for the requirements of harm under section 91(27) of the Constitution Act, 1867 and section 7 of the Charter. They held that Parliament need not establish harm but only a reasonable apprehension of harm.

Gonthier and Binnie looked towards R v Hauser, which held that narcotics were a new matter not considered in 1867 and so falls under the peace, order and good government power. They suggest that this case was likely wrong as narcotics is clearly a matter of criminal law.

The criminal law power, they state, includes the protection of vulnerable groups. Thus the government is able to control activities for the protection of drug users and society.

=== Dissenting opinions ===
Three Justices, Louise Arbour, Louis LeBel, and Marie Deschamps, each authored individual dissenting opinions exclusively on the Caine case.

== Aftermath ==
The legalization of cannabis possession and use was an aspect of the campaign of Justin Trudeau who became Prime Minister in 2015. Shortly after election, the Task Force on Cannabis Legalization and Regulation was convened to study the issue. The Task Force released a report on the matter on December 13, 2016.

On April 13, 2017, Minister of Justice Jody Wilson-Raybould introduced two bills the House of Commons of Canada for the legalization of cannabis. The first was the Cannabis Act, which legalized recreational cannabis use. The second An Act to amend the Criminal Code (offences relating to conveyances) (Bill C-46) increased police powers related to impaired driving such as authorizing mandatory alcohol screening without suspicion that the person is impaired; and increased punishments for driving related offences in the Criminal Code.

== See also ==
- List of Supreme Court of Canada cases (McLachlin Court)
- Fun Guyz
