= FunGuyz =

Illegal mushroom dispensary store chain in Canada

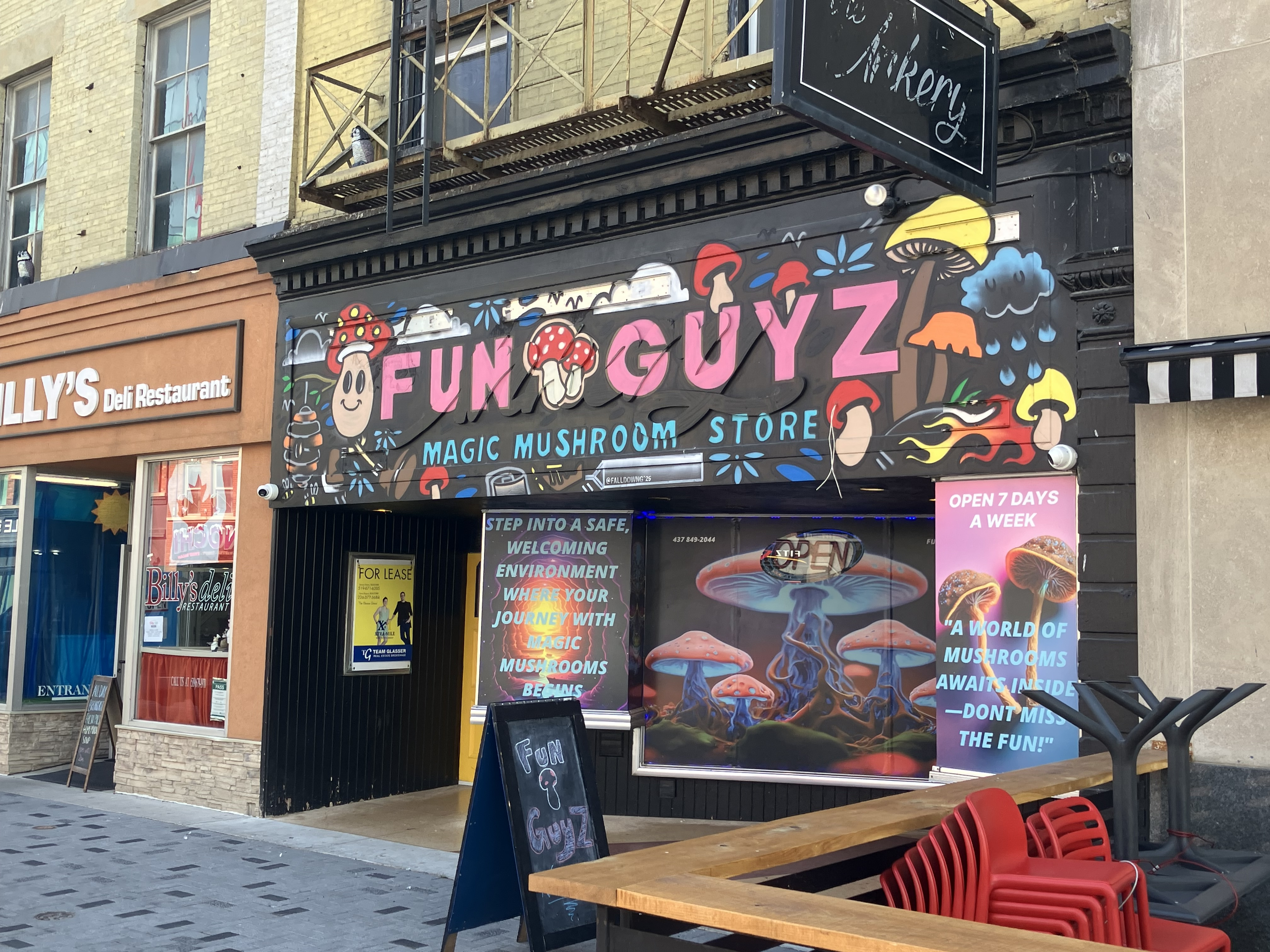
FunGuyz store in London, Ontario in 2023.

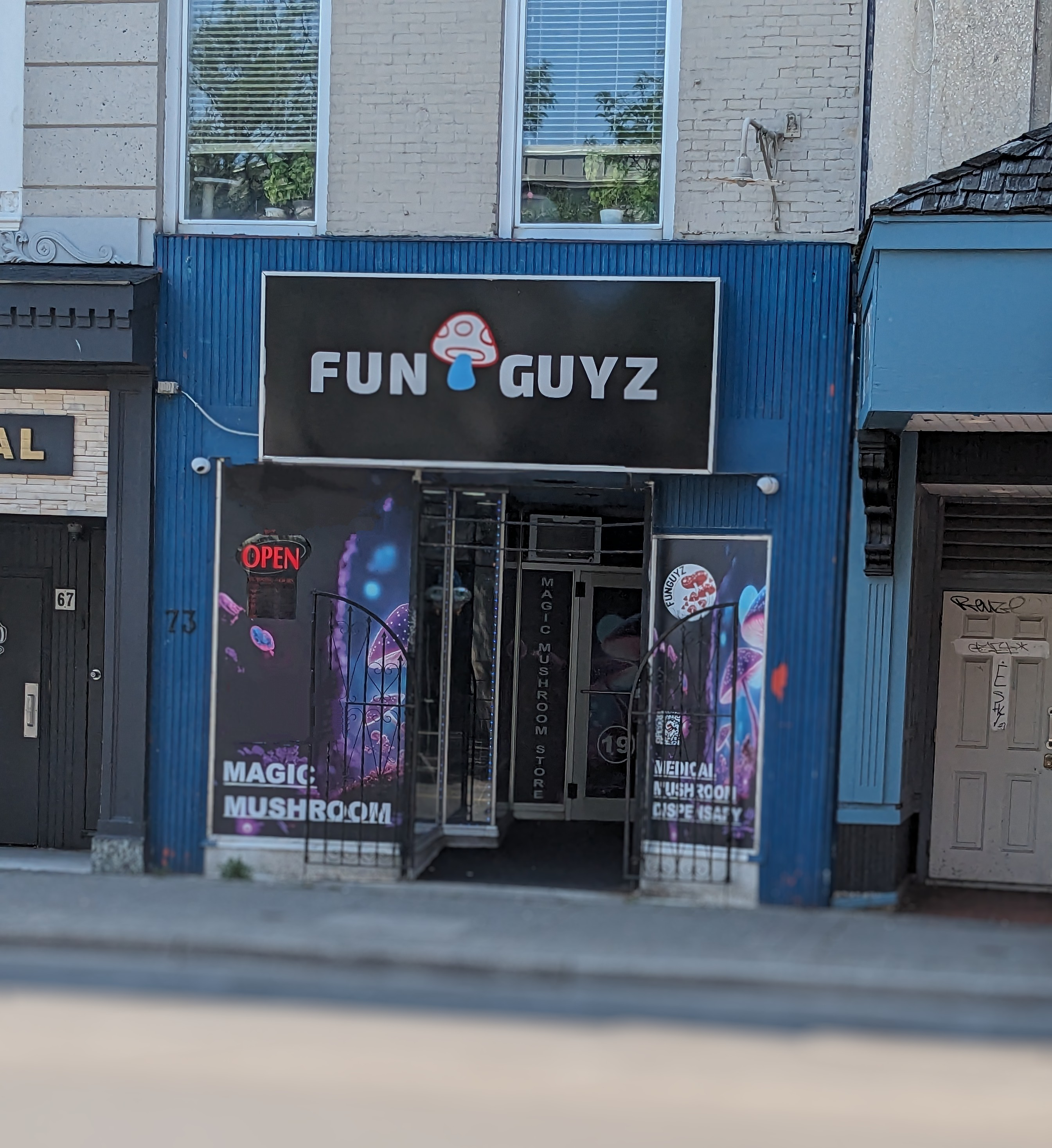
FunGuyz location in Downtown St. Catharines in 2023.

FunGuyz is a Canadian magic mushroom business. It operates illegally, as sale and possession of magic mushrooms is illegal in Canada. Until November 2024, the business operated physical storefronts, with at least 17 stores in Ontario and one in Quebec. These stores were frequently raided and their products confiscated. The raided stores would usually reopen quickly after the seized merchandise had been replaced, with the exception of the five locations that were permanently closed by local authorities. In November 2024, FunGuyz announced plans to close all of its physical stores but keep its online business open.

The owner of the business believes that criminal charges would make a constitutional challenge for the legality of psilocybin possible due to similar actions taken by businesses before the broader legalization of cannabis. He states that his products are for therapeutic use; however, the substance has not been approved by Health Canada. Identities for spokespeople of the business have varied. As of August 2023, police have sought an arrest warrant for the owner of the stores.

== Background ==
Psilocybin occurs naturally in over 200 species of fungi, some of which are colloquially known as "magic mushrooms". Upon this prodrug's ingestion it is converted into psilocin, which produces hallucinogenic effects. Both substances are considered Schedule III substances under the Controlled Drugs and Substances Act. Other illegal mushroom dispensaries unaffiliated with FunGuyz have operated storefronts; such as Shroomyz and The Mushroom Cabinet. Shroomyz was the first such illegal mushroom dispensary in Canada.

The only legal method of obtaining psilocybin is through Health Canada's Special Access Program after all possible treatment options have been exhausted. As of 2020, sixteen healthcare professionals were legally exempt from the laws prohibiting the possession of psilocybin. As of 2021, forty-six patients were granted exemptions under the same program. Psilocybin has been used in some clinical trials but has not received formal approval from Health Canada and has limited comprehensive research supporting its use. Valorie Masuda is a Canadian physician certified in prescribing psychedelics; she advocates for psilocybin to be more accessible in tandem with being regulated to prevent safety hazards that may occur through illicit use.

== History ==
FunGuyz started operating as an illegal business in 2023. FunGuyz operated physical storefronts before announcing their closure in November 2024. There were stores in Barrie, Bradford, Brampton, Brantford, Cambridge, Chatham, Hamilton, Kitchener, London, Montreal, Niagara Falls, Oshawa, Ottawa, Preston, Richmond Hill, St. Catharines, St. Thomas, Toronto (which had 10 locations), Wasaga Beach, and Windsor. The stores operated without a business license. Customers were required to pay in cash when making transactions. Potential customers were also required to be at least 19 years old and sign a liability waiver.

Each store was raided by police but typically reopened, with the exception of the five stores that were shut down permanently by local authorities. These raided stores would reopen after the seized merchandise was replaced. The storefront located in Barrie also had two employees charged with trafficking and possession of illegal drugs; after the raid, the store reopened. In August 2023, an employee at the St. Catharines storefront was charged with psilocybin trafficking and proceeds of property obtained by crime. When the company expanded outside the province of Ontario with a location that opened in Montreal, it was raided the same day it opened and four employees were arrested. The store was raided an additional two times during its first month of business. In 2024, police seized merchandise from several FunGuyz stores, including dried psilocybin mushrooms and psilocybin-infused items such as candies, chocolates, and tea. Police also seized dimethyltryptamine (DMT) vape pens at two stores. DMT is a naturally-occurring hallucinogenic drug that produces similar effects to psilocin but with greater intensity and a shorter duration. Like psilocybin and psilocin, DMT is a Schedule III substance under the Controlled Drugs and Substances Act.

Individual police forces have the ability to decide which matters to prioritize. When Barrie's police force communications coordinator reiterated that the products the store sells are indeed illegal, they declined to answer when a journalist asked them why the store was not raided daily. The Toronto Police Service has indicated that dealing with these illegal businesses is not a high priority. The Waterloo Regional Police Service has stated that it has collaborated with other police forces in Ontario about these illegal businesses and that "there is a large ongoing investigation taking place behind the scenes". In 2023, their Wasaga Beach, Bradford, and St. Thomas locations were shut down by local authorities due to the illegality of their business operations. In 2024, the stores located in Brantford and Kitchener were also permanently closed by police. In October 2024, police shut down 3 magic mushroom labs, which they believed were being produced for commercial businesses.

== See also ==
- Psychedelic mushroom store
- Legal status of psilocybin mushrooms
- Legal status of psychedelic drugs in Canada
- R v Malmo-Levine; R v Caine
- Hallucinogen persisting perception disorder
