= Oregon Psilocybin Services =

Psilocybin regulatory agency in Oregon

Oregon Psilocybin Services is the government agency responsible for regulating the use of psilocybin in Oregon. Oregon Psilocybin Services was created by Oregon Ballot Measure 109, which passed in November 2020. No prescription or referral is necessary to use psilocybin services in Oregon. Participants also do not need to be state residents. Participants need to be at least 21 years old. They also need to complete a mental health history with a licensed facilitator. The mental health history screens for bipolar disorder, a history of psychosis, or a history of suicidal thoughts. Those conditions are contraindicated, and an individual cannot use psilocybin if they have a history of bipolar disorder, lithium use, psychosis or suicidal thoughts. These conditions are contraindicated because the use of psilocybin risks triggering bipolar mania, psychosis, or worsening suicidality. As of 2026, more than 20,000 people have used legal psilocybin at more than 20 centers across Oregon.

== See also ==
- Drug policy of Oregon
- Psilocybin decriminalization in the United States
