= Federal Analogue Act =

Section of the United States Controlled Substances Act

- Other short titles: Alcohol and Drug Abuse Amendments of 1986; Anti-Drug Abuse Act of 1986
- Long title: An Act to strengthen Federal efforts to encourage foreign cooperation in eradicating illicit drug crops and in halting international drug traffic, to improve enforcement of Federal drug laws and enhance interdiction of illicit drug shipments, to provide strong Federal leadership in establishing effective drug abuse prevention and education programs, to expand Federal support for drug abuse treatment and rehabilitation efforts, and for other purposes.
- Nicknames: Controlled Substance Analogue Enforcement Act of 1986
- Enacted by: the 99th United States Congress
- Effective: 27 October 1986

Citations
- Public law: 99-570
- Statutes at Large: 100 Stat. 3207 aka 100 Stat. 3207-13

Legislative history
- Introduced in the House as H.R. 5484 by James C. Wright Jr. (D–TX) on 8 September 1986; Committee consideration by House Armed Services, House Banking, Finance, and Urban Affairs, House Education and Labor, House Foreign Affairs, House Government Operations, House Energy and Commerce, House Interior and Insular Affairs, House Judiciary, House Merchant Marine and Fisheries, House Post Office and Civil Service, House Public Works and Transportation, House Ways and Means; Passed the House on 11 September 1986 (392-16); Passed the Senate on 30 September 1986 (97-2, in lieu of S. 2878) with amendment; House agreed to Senate amendment on 17 October 1986 (unanimous consent) with further amendment; Senate agreed to House amendment on 17 October 1986 (voice vote); Signed into law by President Ronald Reagan on 27 October 1986

The Federal Analogue Act, 21 U.S.C. § 813, is a section of the United States Controlled Substances Act passed in 1986 which allows any chemical "substantially similar" to a controlled substance listed in Schedule I or II to be treated as if it were listed in Schedule I, but only if intended for human consumption. These similar substances are often called designer drugs. The law's broad reach has been used to successfully prosecute possession of chemicals openly sold as dietary supplements and naturally contained in foods (e.g., the possession of phenethylamine, a compound found in chocolate, has been successfully prosecuted based on its "substantial similarity" to the controlled substance methamphetamine).

== Definition ==
21 U.S.C. § 802(32)

- (A) Except as provided in subparagraph (C), the term controlled substance analogue means a substance -
  - (i) the chemical structure of which is substantially similar to the chemical structure of a controlled substance in schedule I or II;
  - (ii) which has a stimulant, depressant, or hallucinogenic effect on the central nervous system that is substantially similar to or greater than the stimulant, depressant, or hallucinogenic effect on the central nervous system of a controlled substance in schedule I or II; or
  - (iii) with respect to a particular person, which such person represents or intends to have a stimulant, depressant, or hallucinogenic effect on the central nervous system that is substantially similar to or greater than the stimulant, depressant, or hallucinogenic effect on the central nervous system of a controlled substance in schedule I or II.
- (B) The designation of gamma butyrolactone or any other chemical as a listed chemical pursuant to paragraph (34) or (35) does not preclude a finding pursuant to subparagraph (A) of this paragraph that the chemical is a controlled substance analogue.
- (C) Such term does not include -
  - (i) a controlled substance;
  - (ii) any substance for which there is an approved new drug application;
  - (iii) with respect to a particular person any substance, if an exemption is in effect for investigational use, for that person, under section 355 of this title to the extent conduct with respect to such substance is pursuant to such exemption; or
  - (iv) any substance to the extent not intended for human consumption before such an exemption takes effect with respect to that substance.

== Case law ==
=== United States v. Forbes ===
United States v. Forbes, 806 F. Supp. 232 (D. Colo. 1992), a Colorado district court case, considered the question of whether the drug alpha-ethyltryptamine (AET) was a controlled substance analogue in the United States. The controlled drugs to which it was alleged that AET was substantially similar were the tryptamine analogues dimethyltryptamine (DMT) and diethyltryptamine (DET).

AET

DMT

DET

In this case, the court ruled that AET was not substantially similar to DMT or DET, on the grounds that (i) AET is a primary amine while DMT and DET are tertiary amines, (ii) AET cannot be synthesized from either DMT or DET, and (iii) the hallucinogenic or stimulant effects of AET are not substantially similar to the effects of DMT or DET. Furthermore, the court ruled that the definition of controlled substance analogue given in the Federal Analogue Act was unconstitutionally vague, in that

"Because the definition of 'analogue' as applied here provides neither fair warning nor effective safeguards against arbitrary enforcement, it is void for vagueness."

The common law principle that the people should have the right to know what the law is, means that the wording of laws should be sufficiently clear and precise that it is possible to give a definitive answer as to whether a particular course of action is legal or illegal. However, despite this ruling the Federal Analogue Act was not revised, and instead AET was specifically scheduled to avoid any future discrepancies.

As a district court decision, this case is not binding precedent.

=== United States v. Washam ===
United States v. Washam (2002) 312 F.3d 926, 930 was an appellate decision for the eighth judicial circuit in which it was considered whether the drug 1,4-Butanediol (1,4-B) was a controlled substance analogue in the United States. The controlled drug which it was alleged 1,4-B was substantially similar to was gamma-hydroxybutyrate (GHB).

1,4-B

GHB

In this case the court ruled that 1,4-B was substantially similar to GHB, on the grounds that (i) "1,4-Butanediol and GHB are both linear compounds containing four carbons and that there is only one difference between the substances on one side of their molecules", and, more importantly, (ii) that 1,4-B is metabolized into GHB by the body and so produces substantially similar physiological effects.

It was raised in defense that 1,4-B and GHB contain different functional groups. but these were not held to be grounds to consider 1,4-B not substantially similar to GHB.

It was also raised in the case of Washam that the Federal Analogue Act was unconstitutionally vague, but in this case the court rejected this argument on the grounds that the defendant's actions in concealing her activities and lying to DEA agents showed that she knew her actions were illegal, and furthermore that "…a person of common intelligence has sufficient notice under the statute that 1,4-Butanediol is a controlled substance analogue." The court in Washam construed the Analogue Act to require parts A(i) and either A(ii) or A(iii), and concluded the Act was constitutionally permissible upon this construction.

As a result of Washam, the Federal Analogue Act has been upheld (at least for the states and territories comprising the eighth judicial circuit) and can be considered valid at the present time.

However, a jury in Federal District Court in Chicago in a different case found 1,4-butanediol not to be an analog of GHB under federal law, and the Seventh Circuit Court of Appeals upheld that verdict and so 1,4-butanediol is currently not a controlled substance analogue.

== Exceptions ==
=== Temple of the True Inner Light ===
The Temple of the True Inner Light, a small psychedelic church in New York City which believes that psychedelic drugs such as dipropyltryptamine (DPT) are the physical form of God, was founded in 1980 and has operated for decades since then. DPT has never been made an explicitly controlled substance in the United States, though it could be considered an analogue of Schedule I psychedelic tryptamines such as dimethyltryptamine (DMT) and diethyltryptamine (DET) under the Federal Analogue Act. Despite this however, although the Drug Enforcement Administration (DEA) and other authorities have been well-aware of the Temple of the True Inner Light, they have opted not to interfere with their operations. Instead, a representative for the DEA stated that they would likely step in if the drug ever became a major problem, specifically giving MDMA (Ecstasy) as an example of this that had been scheduled a few years earlier. Other reasons for the church being left alone include their nature as a religious group, their history of legal efforts, and New York City being preoccupied with more dangerous drugs and organizations.

=== Voyager Labs ===
Judd Weiss, a businessman and former 2016 American Libertarian Vice Presidential candidate, launched a new company called Voyager Labs in the mid-2020s selling uncontrolled designer psychedelics and entactogens such as 4-HO-MET (metocin; Xüm) (a close analogue of psilocin) and 5-MAPB (Plür) (a close analogue of MDMA) for explicit recreational use. According to Weiss, the Federal Analogue Act is "effectively dead", and he says that he is unconcerned about the law with regard to his business operations. This was based on past critiques by Supreme Court justice Neil Gorsuch of the law being too vague and on notions that the Drug Enforcement Administration (DEA) is preoccupied with more dangerous drugs like fentanyl. Relatedly, mushroom edibles containing the unscheduled designer psychedelic and psilocin prodrug 4-AcO-DMT (psilacetin; O-acetylpsilocin) surged in the United States as an alternative to illegal psilocybin in the early 2020s and have remained legally unencumbered.

== See also ==
- DEA list of chemicals, aka the "DEA Watchlist"
- Operation Web Tryp
