= Mushroom tea =

Infusion of mushrooms in water

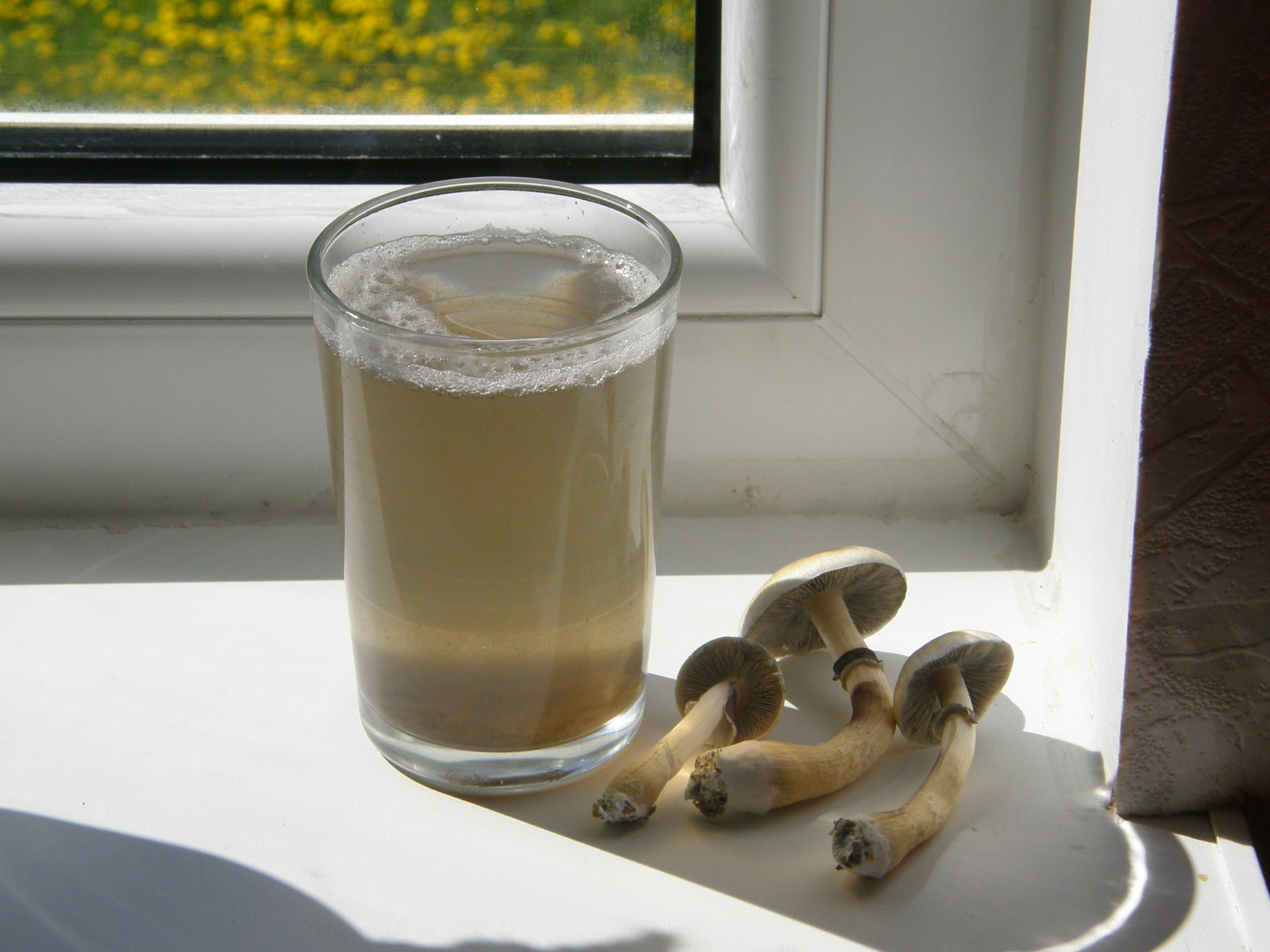
Psychedelic mushroom tea (P. cubensis)

Mushroom tea is an infusion of mushrooms in water, made by using edible/medicinal mushrooms (such as lingzhi mushroom) or psychedelic mushrooms (such as Psilocybe cubensis). The active ingredient in psychedelic mushroom teas are psilocin and its prodrug psilocybin. The active ingredients in medicinal mushroom teas are quite variable.

== Korea ==
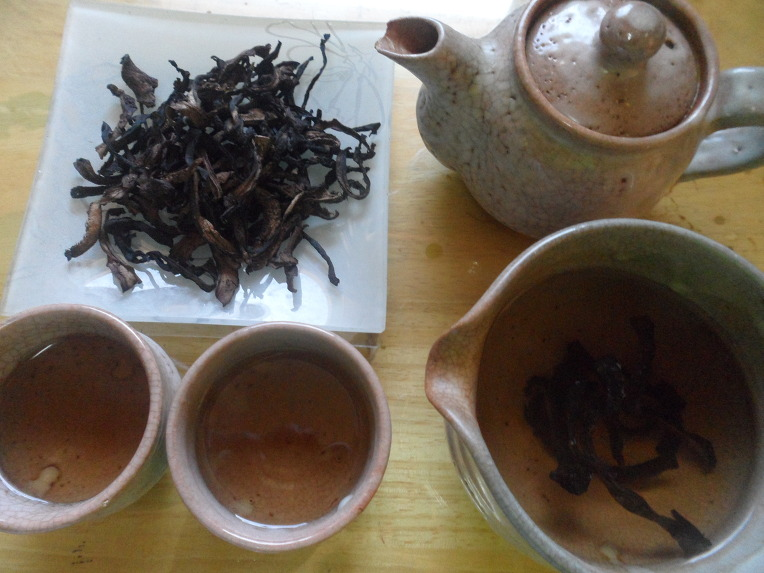
Korean neungi-cha (scaly hedgehog tea)

In Korea, mushroom teas known as beoseot-cha (버섯차 [pʌ.sʌt̚.tɕʰa]) are made from edible mushrooms such as black hoof mushroom, lingzhi mushroom, oyster mushroom, scaly hedgehog, and shiitake mushroom.

- Neungi-cha (능이차) – scaly hedgehog tea
- Neutari-cha (느타리차) – oyster mushroom tea
- Pyogo-cha (표고차) – shiitake mushroom tea
- Sanghwang-cha (상황차) – black hoof mushroom tea
- Yeongji-cha (영지차) – lingzhi mushroom tea

== See also ==
- Kombucha (tea mushroom)
- Mushroom diet
- Mushroom edible
- Psychedelic mushroom store
- Psychedelic mushrooms
