= Psychedelic mushroom store =

Retail outlet selling hallucinogenic mushroom products

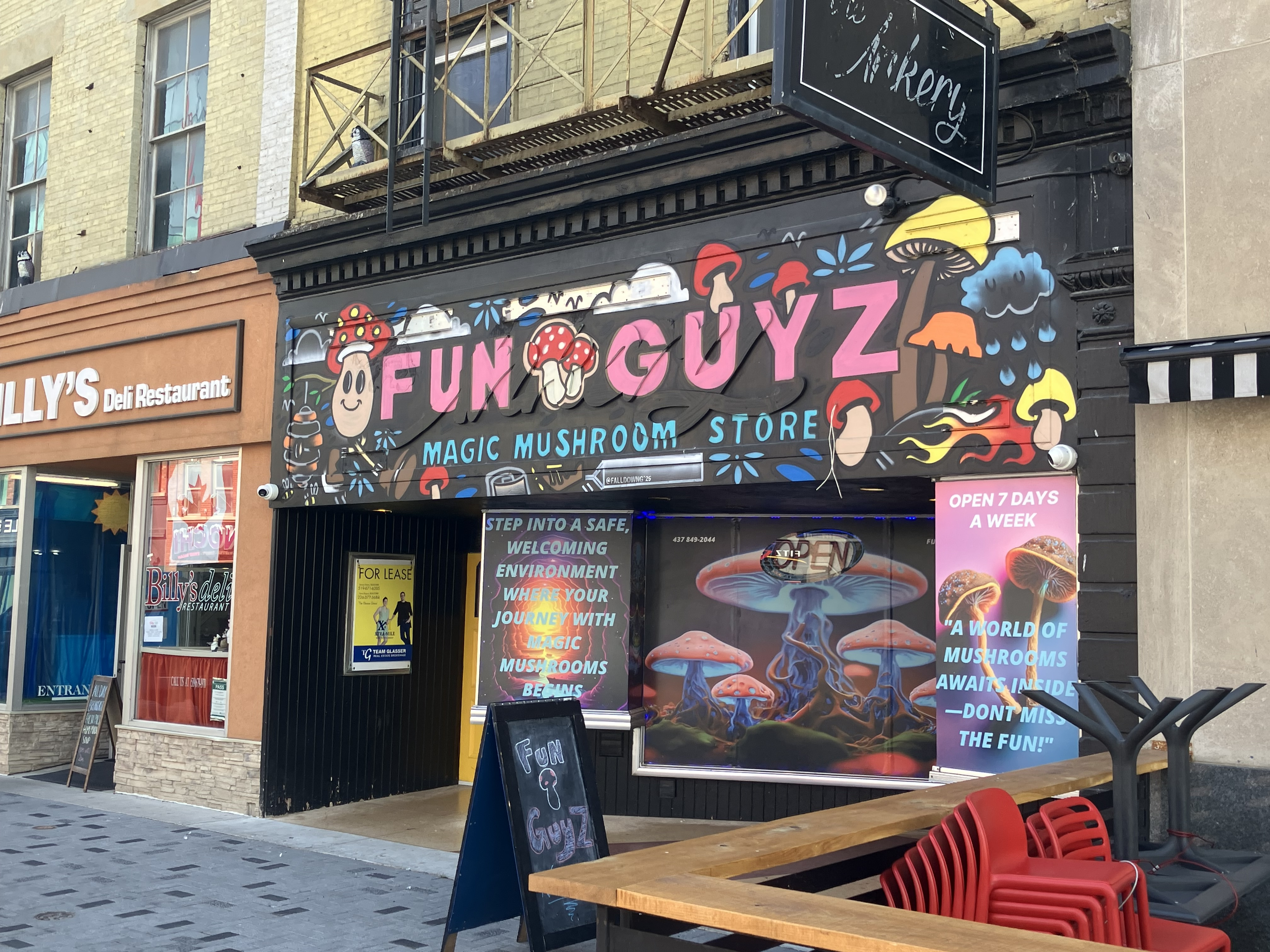
A FunGuyz psychedelic mushroom store in London, Ontario, Canada.

A psychedelic mushroom store, also known as a magic mushroom dispensary, is a retail outlet that sells hallucinogenic mushroom products. They are analogous to cannabis dispensaries. Spurred by the 21st-century psychedelic renaissance, by increasing societal acceptance of psilocybin mushrooms, and by loosening of regulations, psychedelic mushroom stores started to be opened and to gain popularity in the early 2020s in certain parts of the United States and Canada. There have also been earlier instances of such stores, for example in Europe in the 2000s. In addition, magic mushroom products are or have been sold by stores and cafes in other parts of the world.

The stores may sell actual hallucinogenic mushrooms such as psilocybin mushrooms and Amanita muscaria mushrooms. Additionally or alternatively, they may sell mushroom edible products such as chocolate bars, gummies, or drinks that contain hallucinogenic mushroom constituents like psilocybin or muscimol or that contain synthetic analogues of these compounds such as 4-AcO-DMT (O-acetylpsilocin; psilacetin). Some notable brands of mushroom edible products include PolkaDot and Tre House. Both psilocybin and 4-AcO-DMT are prodrugs of the serotonergic psychedelic psilocin. Psychedelic mushroom stores operate in a legal grey area and the products sold by these stores may be either illegal controlled substances (e.g., psilocybin mushrooms, psilocybin) or legal (e.g., Amanita muscaria mushrooms, 4-AcO-DMT) depending on the product ingredients and jurisdiction. Some stores selling clearly illegal products have been raided by government authorities and/or shut down.

The mushroom edible market is unregulated and it is frequently unclear what these products actually contain or what doses are present within them. Oftentimes the products may only be labeled with ingredients like "mushroom blend", "magic blend", or "mushroom extract". There have been cases of poisonings linked to certain mushroom edible products, for instance hundreds of cases of poisonings with Diamond Shruumz products in the United States. These cases have included several deaths.

Magic mushroom stores are known to exist throughout certain states in the United States like California and certain provinces in Canada like British Columbia and Ontario. A notable example is a store called ShroomLand LA in the Venice Beach neighborhood of Los Angeles in California. Psychedelic mushroom stores are also known to operate online in the United States and Canada. Numerous stores were prevalent in the United Kingdom in the 2000s when a legal loophole allowed magic mushrooms to be sold, but the loophole was closed in 2005 and the products stopped being sold. Similarly, there were numerous stores selling magic mushrooms in the Netherlands in the 1990s and 2000s, but magic mushrooms became illegal in this country in 2008. However, magic truffles, which are the psilocybin-containing sclerotium of magic mushrooms, have remained legal and sold in the Netherlands due to another legal loophole. Stores and/or cafes in other parts of the world have also been known to sell magic mushroom products, including in Brazil, Indonesia, Jamaica, and Thailand, among other countries and territories.

On 28 November 2022, voters in the state of Colorado voted to decriminalize the possession, growing, and sharing of five psychedelics for personal use: psilocybin, psilocyn, dimethyltryptamine (DMT), ibogaine, and mescaline, for those aged 21-years-old and over, via Proposition 122. Decriminalization officially took effect by law in Colorado on 27 December 2022. While not "stores", the initiative also included the provision to legalize "healing centers" that are licensed by the state's Department of Regulatory Agencies, where those aged 21 and over can buy, consume, and take psychedelics under supervision. On 1 July 2023, the state created the Natural Medicine Advisory Board and a division within the Department of Revenue for regulating and licensing the listed fungi and plants. The Department of Revenue's Natural Medicine Division issued Colorado's first healing center business license on 31 March 2025. The first healing center in Colorado opened in July 2025.

Psilocybin-containing mushroom stores in Canada were comprehensively studied and described in 2026.

== See also ==
- Smart shop
- Mushroom edible
- Legal status of psilocybin mushrooms
- Online illicit drug vendor
- Psilocybin decriminalization in the United States
- Timeline of psychedelic legalization and decriminalization
- Psilocybin therapy
- FunGuyz
- Shroom House
- Judd Weiss
