= 2020 Oregon Ballot Measure 109 =

Ballot Measure 109
- Oregon Psilocybin Services Act: Allows manufacture, delivery, administration of psilocybin at supervised, licensed facilities; imposes two-year development period

Results
Choice	Votes	%
Yes	1,270,057	55.75%
No	1,008,199	44.25%
Total votes	2,214,856	100.00%
- Results by county Yes: 50–60% 60–70% 70–80% No: 50–60% 60–70% 70–80%

In 2020, voters in the U.S. state of Oregon passed Ballot Measure 109, also known as the Oregon Psilocybin Services Act, allowing the "manufacture, delivery and administration" of psilocybin, a naturally occurring psychedelic prodrug. While psilocybin remains illegal nationally, the passage of the law made Oregon the first U.S. state to legalize the drug. Per the law, psilocybin must be used for "personal development" and grown and administered in licensed environments. The ballot measure put in place a two-year period for the government to determine regulations around the law's implementation, such as what credentials will be needed for someone to administer the drug. Ballot Measure 109 created Oregon Psilocybin Services.

The chief petitioners behind the bill were Thomas Eckert and his late first wife, Sheri Eckert, both therapists who had been working for years to legalize psilocybin because of its potential benefit for people struggling with conditions including depression, anxiety, and addiction. To get the initiative (called the Psilocybin Service Initiative, or Initiative Petition #34) on the November 2020 ballot, 112,020 signatures of support from Oregonians had to be collected. On November 3, 2020, Ballot Measure 109 was passed with support from 1.27 million Oregonians, or 55.75% of the vote (according to unofficial results from the Oregon Secretary of State in the days following the election).

Vote tallies by county:

County	Yes	Votes	No	Votes	Total
Baker	36.42	3,479	63.58	6,073	9,552
Benton	63.39	32,276	36.61	18,639	50,915
Clackamas	52.40	128,890	47.60	117,098	245,988
Clatsop	55.02	12,707	44.98	10,388	23,095
Columbia	50.84	15,827	49.16	15,307	31,134
Coos	45.33	16,034	54.67	19,334	35,368
Crook	35.47	5,301	64.53	9,643	14,944
Curry	50.39	7,234	49.61	7,123	14,357
Deschutes	52.80	63,841	47.20	57,064	120,905
Douglas	39.83	24,751	60.17	37,386	62,137
Gilliam	35.57	408	64.43	739	1,147
Grant	33.37	1,487	66.63	2,969	4,456
Harney	29.91	1,283	70.09	3,007	4,290
Hood River	63.23	7,964	36.77	4,632	12,596
Jackson	51.19	62,692	48.81	59,774	122,466
Jefferson	40.63	4,662	59.37	6,811	11,473
Josephine	46.30	22,615	53.70	26,225	48,840
Klamath	39.79	14,056	60.21	21,268	35,324
Lake	29.03	1,209	70.97	2,955	4,164
Lane	59.88	127,241	40.12	85,262	212,503
Lincoln	57.64	17,055	42.36	12,535	29,590
Linn	44.74	31,423	55.26	38,814	70,237
Malheur	30.58	3,475	69.42	7,890	11,365
Marion	49.42	78,389	50.58	80,216	158,605
Morrow	34.11	1,689	65.89	3,263	4,952
Multnomah	71.19	318,425	28.81	128,871	447,296
Polk	48.60	22,730	51.40	24,039	46,769
Sherman	34.42	400	65.58	762	1,162
Tillamook	51.57	8,429	48.43	7,916	16,345
Umatilla	36.02	11,330	63.98	20,126	31,456
Union	37.94	5,453	62.06	8,921	14,374
Wallowa	34.90	1,742	65.10	3,249	4,991
Wasco	50.61	6,880	49.39	6,713	13,593
Washington	59.10	180,112	40.90	124,626	304,738
Wheeler	34.84	323	65.16	604	927
Yamhill	50.26	28,245	49.74	27,957	56,202

== Implementation ==
The Oregon Health Authority runs the Oregon Psilocybin Services program, which is creating regulations and issuing licenses for all aspects of the program. They began accepting applications for licensure on January 2, 2023. After that date, treatment providers who are licensed, using tested psilocybin from licensed suppliers, were able to legally screen and treat individuals with psilocybin in Oregon. The program posted draft regulations for public notice and comment in April 2022. In the 2022 midterm elections, however, a total of 102 incorporated cities and 25 counties in the state voted, temporarily or permanently, to prohibit psilocybin-related business from being conducted within specified areas.

As of 2025, psilocybin therapy is permitted in the following counties: Benton, Clatsop, Columbia, Deschutes, Hood River, Jackson, Lane, Lincoln, Multnomah, Wasco, Washington, and Yamhill.

== See also ==
- List of Oregon ballot measures
- Oregon Psilocybin Services
- Psilocybin decriminalization in the United States
- Shroom House
