= Mushroom edible =

Food containing hallucinogenic substances

A mushroom edible, also known as a psychedelic mushroom edible or hallucinogenic mushroom edible and sometimes as "legal shrooms", is a food item that may contain hallucinogens associated with those in psychoactive mushrooms, such as psilocybin mushrooms or Amanita muscaria mushrooms. They include chocolate bars and gummies, among others.

Mushroom edibles have become increasingly popular in the United States in the 2020s. They exist in a legal gray area, and may or may not be illegal depending on the ingredients. One mushroom edibles brand, Diamond Shruumz, has been linked to hundreds of poisonings, including deaths. The Food and Drug Administration (FDA) has warned consumers not to buy or eat mushroom edibles. In addition, the FDA explicitly banned Amanita muscaria ingredients in food products in the United States in late 2024. The FDA is currently evaluating the use of Amanita muscaria and its constituents in dietary supplements, reminding manufacturers to ensure their ingredients meet safety standards and encouraging them to consult the Office of Dietary Supplement Programs with any questions.

== Description ==
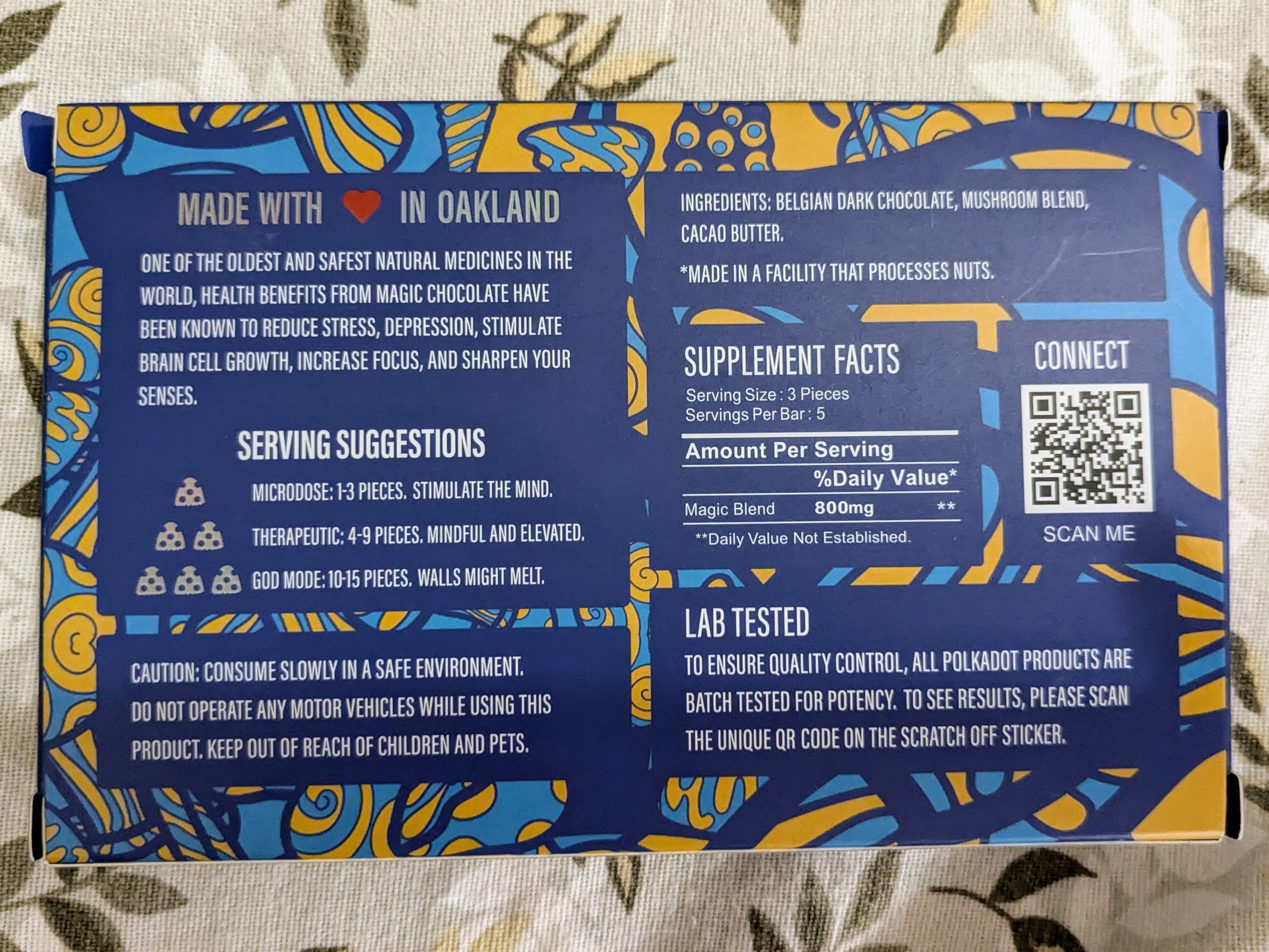
Front (top) and back (bottom) of a PolkaDot mushroom chocolate bar purchased in California.

Mushroom edibles can contain compounds found in or related to those in psilocybin mushrooms such as psilocybin, psilocin, or 4-AcO-DMT (psilacetin; "synthetic shrooms") or those in Amanita muscaria mushrooms such as muscimol or ibotenic acid. Psilocybin mushrooms are a serotonergic psychedelic, while Amanita muscaria mushrooms are a GABAergic sedative-hallucinogen. 4-AcO-DMT, a synthetic analogue of psilocybin (4-PO-DMT), is a prodrug of psilocin similarly to psilocybin itself. Mushroom edibles may also contain completely unrelated substances, with identified compounds having included cathinones, 4-AcO-DET, the scheduled prescription drug pregabalin, and kava kava extract. Their ingredients are often not specified and may simply say "proprietary mushroom blend" or "magic blend".

Mushroom edibles started being sold in the United States in the 2020s and began to surge in popularity in 2023. They include chocolate bars, gummies, and other food items. The products are often sold at smoke or head shops, cannabis stores, and gas stations, as well as online. Some of the most well-known brands in the United States include PolkaDot and Tre House. The widespread market availability of Amanita muscaria products, as opposed to hallucinogenic mushrooms in general, is a relatively recent development. This mushroom is often inappropriately conflated with psilocybin mushrooms, including in terms of safety as well as possible therapeutic benefits when used medically. Mushroom edibles in general exist in a legal gray area in the United States and are unregulated. There are often knockoff or counterfeit products that imitate major brands and may have completely different ingredients in spite of similar branding.

In December 2024, it was reported that a company called PsiloSafe had launched a testing and certification program for magic mushroom products. The aim is to ensure the ingredients, potency, and safety of the products. Some 15 product brands have partnered with PsiloSafe.

== Legality ==
Amanita muscaria and constituents like muscimol and ibotenic acid are not controlled substances in most of the United States and hence are considered legal. However, other substances that may be in mushroom edibles, such as psilocybin and psilocin, are controlled substances and hence are illegal. In December 2024, the U.S. Food and Drug Administration (FDA) banned the Amanita muscaria constituents muscimol, ibotenic acid, and muscarine from food products including mushroom edibles. The agency could push the Drug Enforcement Agency to classify Amanita muscaria or its active compounds as controlled substances, but whether enforcement occurs depends on the Trump administration's approach, with the FDA typically issuing warning letters without strict action unless serious safety issues arise—similar to how hemp-derived products like Delta-9 THC and CBD are currently handled. The FDA and other government agencies such as the California Department of Public Health (CDPH) have warned consumers not to buy or eat mushroom edibles.

== Poisonings ==
One mushroom edible brand, Diamond Shruumz, has been linked to hundreds of poisonings, including three deaths, and was recalled. The FDA conducted an investigation and identified ingredients including muscimol, psilacetin, psilocybin, pregabalin, and kava constituents. It is unclear exactly why the products caused poisonings, but it may have been related to toxic amounts of muscimol or to presence of ibotenic acid, a known neurotoxin and convulsant. In general, Amanita muscaria mushrooms are known to be much more toxic when ingested than psilocybin mushrooms. There is also little quality control in terms of the dosing of mushroom edibles, and amounts of active ingredients may vary considerably even within the same product. Children have also been poisoned by mushroom edibles, for instance after stealing chocolate bars from their parents.

== See also ==
- Cannabis edible
- Magic truffle
- Mushroom tea
- Psychedelic mushroom store
- Judd Weiss
