= Smart shop =

Retail establishment that specializes in the sales of psychoactive substances

A smart shop (or smartshop) is a retail establishment that specializes in the sale of psychoactive substances, usually including psychedelics, as well as related literature and paraphernalia. The name derives from the name "smart drugs", a class of drugs and food supplements intended to enhance cognitive abilities which are often sold in smart shops.

== The rise of anonymous smart shops ==
Some governments do not tolerate smart shops in any form as a part of their crime prevention. For example, the Government of the Kingdom of Sweden with its zero tolerance drug policy, does not accept physical smart shops and has shut down every known Swedish online smart shop that have been selling pure research chemicals on the visible Web. To circumvent this, the usage of anonymous marketplaces through the Tor network has taken over since the establishment of Silk Road, which in contrast took the FBI two and a half years to take down for one month.

== Typical products specialization ==
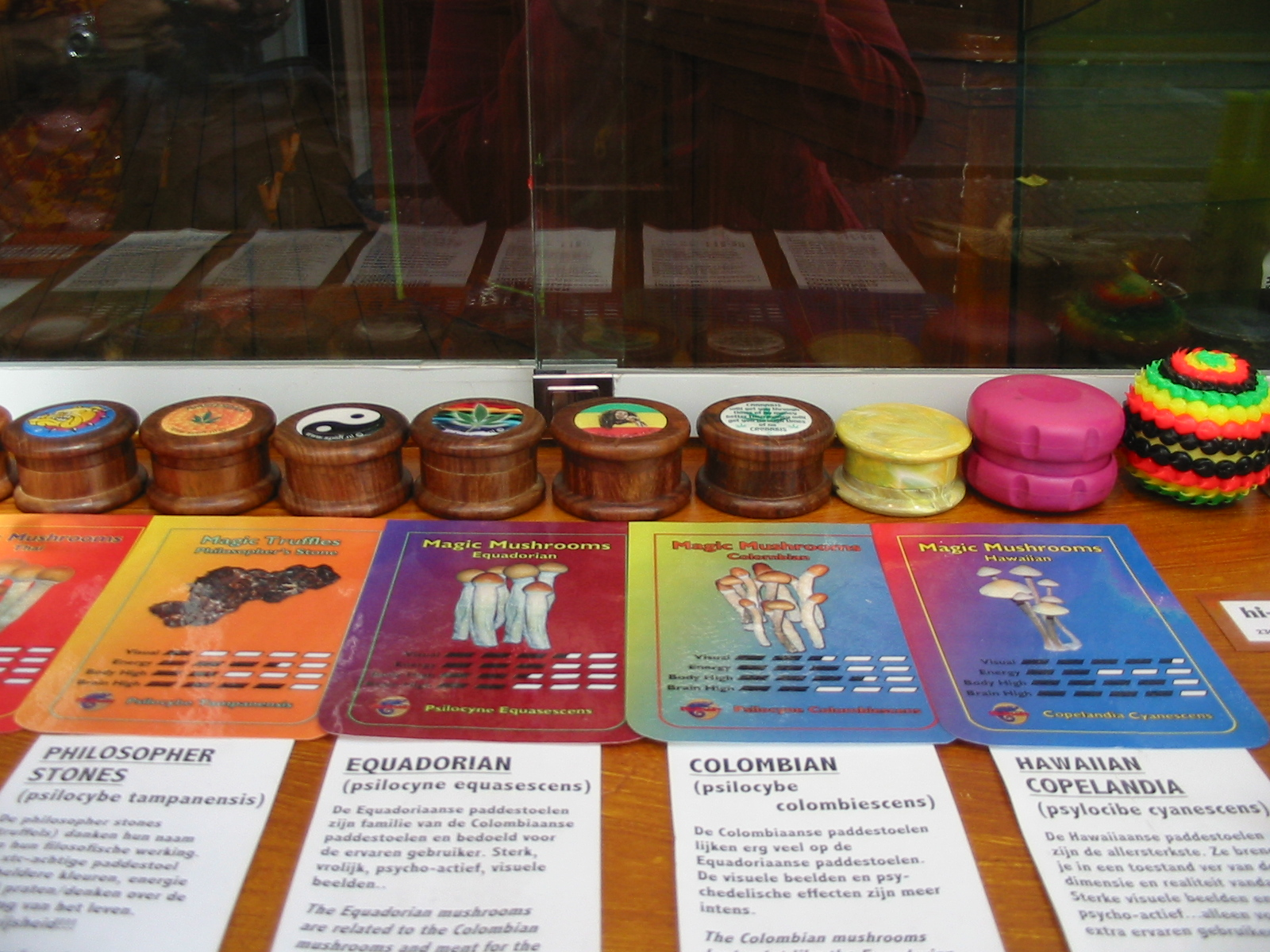
A Dutch smart shop with herb grinders on display

=== Smart drugs ===
Smart shops (often webshops) offer prescription-free pharmacy products such as Ritalin, Adderall, and modafinil, for example.

=== Psychedelics, dissociatives, and deliriants ===
==== Traditional entheogens ====
Smart shops are best known in practice for selling whatever psychedelics, dissociatives, entactogens and deliriants local law permits. In the Netherlands, which is home to most of the smart shops in Europe, this includes Salvia divinorum, Amanita muscaria, Peyote, San Pedro cactus, Tabernanthe iboga, and various ingredients for Ayahuasca preparations. As of 1 December 2008, magic mushrooms are under stricter control in the Netherlands. Those new controls are quite controversial, because the list of banned mushrooms also contains species that have no psychoactive substances. Magic Mushroom spore prints and grow boxes are still available over the counter in the Netherlands. Psilocybin is not included in the ban and continues to be sold in smart shops nationwide in truffle form.

==== Decline of designer drugs ====
Smart shops in various countries have been known in the past to sell designer drugs: that is, synthetic substances that were not (yet) illegal. The sale of synthetic drugs not explicitly approved as food, supplements or medicines is illegal in some of them. For example, in the Netherlands it is dealt with by the relatively benign machinery of the Warenautoriteit (Commodities Authority) rather than in criminal law, as would be the case with controlled substances.

Yet, this has made it effectively impossible to sell them in a formal retail setting, even if their production and possession is entirely legitimate. Smart shops have attempted no further marketing of synthetics since they tried to sell methylone as a "room odorizer" but were ultimately forced to pull it from their shelves in 2004, though it can still be obtained under the counter in some shops.

=== Drug paraphernalia ===
Smart shops sell many products that can be seen as complement goods to psychoactive drugs, including illegal ones. Smart shop is distinguished from head shops found in many countries. Head shops provide only paraphernalia, whereas smart shops typically also sell recreational drugs. Many British head shops sold magic mushrooms until July 2005, when the Government introduced a complete ban on magic mushrooms. Many of the British head shops still sell a range of other legal highs.

== Education and information ==
Smart shops have become a natural source of information about the drugs they sell. They commonly provide instruction leaflets similar to the package inserts distributed with prescription drugs, which contain information on contra-indications, side effects, and the importance of set and setting. In the Netherlands, there is relatively little formal regulation of the smart shop industry, but the natural concentration of expertise about a relatively exotic range of products in combination with the realization that closer public scrutiny and regulation are always lurking in the background have caused the smart shops to organize into an industry association that, among other things, promotes the spread of information about its wares.

== Legality ==
=== The Netherlands ===
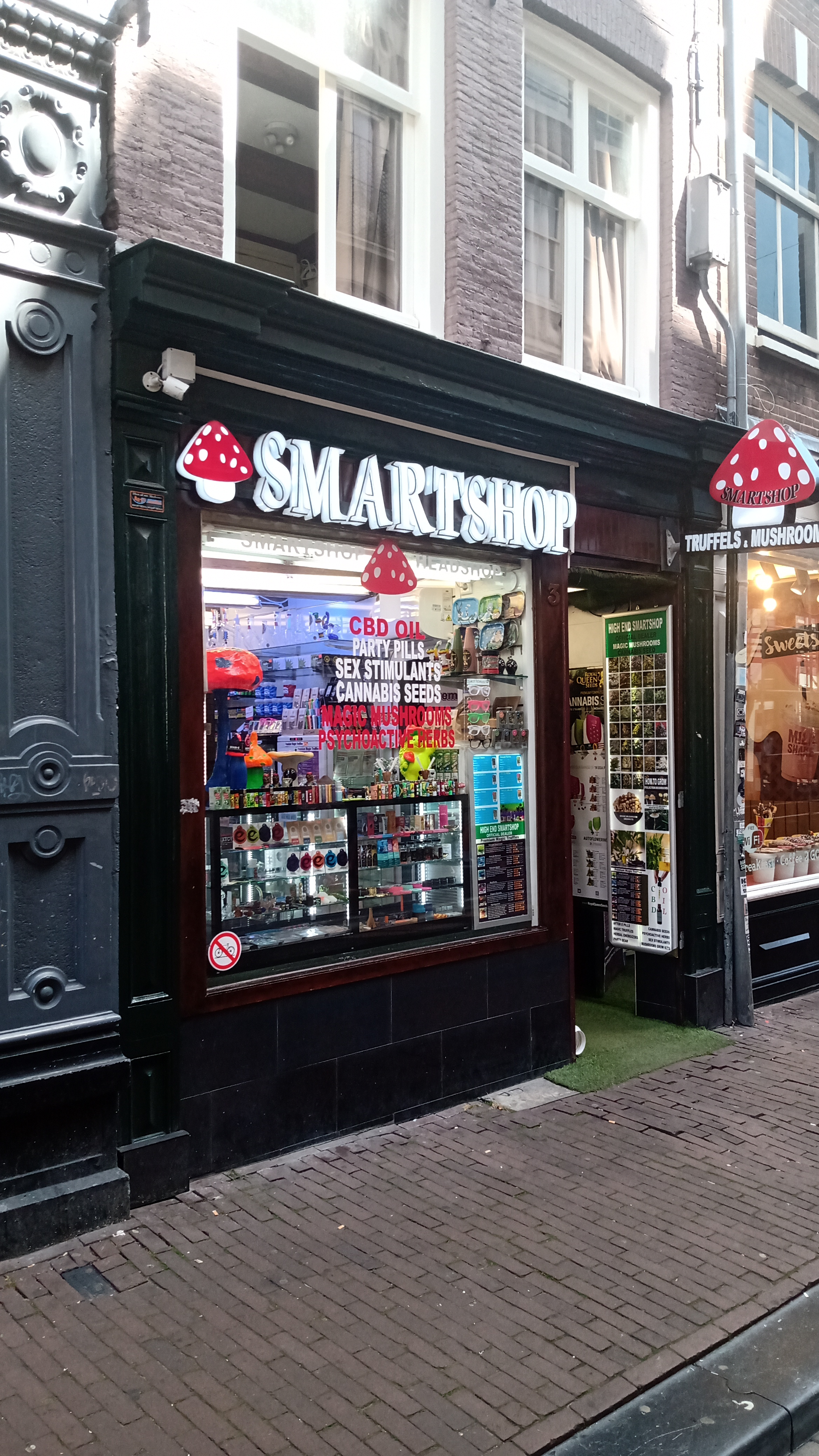
A smart shop in Amsterdam, Netherlands in 2021

Legally, smart shops operate under a decision of the Hoge Raad (Supreme Court) that has declared that unprepared mushrooms and cacti are not considered "preparations" of the substances they contain, and are therefore not banned under the Opium Act or international law even if their active ingredients are.

There are some shops from the Netherlands that operate as both a smart shop and a head shop on an international level. Customers are expected to accept the responsibility to inform themselves about the local laws, import and custom regulations before ordering and to certify that the import to their country of the products ordered is legal.

As of December 1, 2008, the sale of magic mushrooms was subject to tighter control in the Netherlands.

This legal regime is markedly different from the one that applies to cannabis products. Those are formally illegal under the Opium Act and international law, which explicitly bans the plant rather than the cannabinoids in it. Cannabis products such as marijuana and hashish can be sold and possessed only pursuant to a web of executive orders more-or-less silently assented to by parliament. The sale of magic mushrooms, on the other hand, was entirely legal and subject only to the common regulation of foodstuffs by the Warenautoriteit (Commodities Authority).

=== Republic of Ireland ===
In the Republic of Ireland, there was a sharp rise in Smart shops around the Celtic Tiger era, however, given new government legislations against psychoactive substances, Smart shops that do still operate in the Republic of Ireland have become shops for paraphernalia and growing equipment, more comparable to a Head Shop.

=== UK ===
As with UK based head shops, both paraphernalia and "legal highs" are available from these stores, such as Salvia divinorum-based products designed to simulate illegal drug highs such as those experienced through the use of amphetamine [speed], methamphetamine, and psychedelics [psilocybin]. Magic mushrooms were available until the government closed a loophole, effectively banning the sale of raw or prepared magic mushrooms in January 2006.

Since the passing of the Psychoactive Substances Act 2016, the sale of any chemical substance which alters or affects mental functioning in any way is illegal. This has effectively rendered the term "smartshop" obsolete in the UK.

=== Portugal ===
In Portugal, prior to March 2013, the drug laws were very liberal, and several smartshops were opened. A chain store, called Magic Mushroom, emerged as the market leader. Shops in Portugal still sell all type of herbal incense and plant feeders. In March 2013, the Portuguese Government enacted a law making it illegal to sell psychoactive drugs, thus ending the smartshop business in the country.

== See also ==
- October 2010 raid on smart shops in Poland
- Drug policy of the Netherlands
- Cannabis coffee shop
- Online illicit drug vendor
- Psychedelic mushroom store
