= Bay Staters for Natural Medicine =

Bay Staters for Natural Medicine is a Massachusetts-based, grassroots community group that educates people on the safe, spiritual use of psychedelics and the public health consequences of the so-called "war on drugs." The group hosts community events across the Northeastern U.S., including forages for all kinds of mushrooms, classes on growing mushrooms, socials to learn about alternative medicine, breath workshops, and parties. This community organizing grew out of local advocacy efforts to pass measures in cities where its now thousands of volunteers live across the region.

== History ==
In January 2021, Bay Staters for Natural Medicine, with the support of around fifty local volunteers, achieved its first success in helping the City of Somerville decriminalize possession of all controlled substances, including growing and distribution of psychedelic fungi and plants. The inclusion of decriminalization for all controlled substances was a strong departure from other measures passed around the country: particularly those led by Decriminalize Nature, which at the time opposed broader decriminalization reform

In February 2021, after a similar collaboration between Bay Staters and local groups, the City of Cambridge adopted a similar resolution, led by City Councilor Jivan Sobrinho-Wheeler.

In March 2021, after being contacted by members of Bay Staters, Northampton Massachusetts City Councilors Rachel Maiore (Ward 7) and William Dwight (At Large) co-sponsored a similar resolution supporting the decriminalization of the use and possession all of controlled substances, specifically highlighting the benefits psychedelics can have for mental health and addiction challenges. This measure was unanimously approved on April 2, 2021.

In October 2021, the City of Easthampton became the fourth city in Massachusetts to decriminalize psychedelics with the leadership and organizing of Bay Staters for Natural Medicine.
