= Diamond Shruumz =

Brand of mushroom edibles

- Current owner: Prophet Premium Blends
- Country: United States
- Website: https://diamondshruumz.com/

Diamond Shruumz, also sometimes referred to as Diamond Shrooms, is a brand of mushroom edibles sold by Prophet Premium Blends, a company located in Santa Ana, California in the United States. It includes chocolate bar, gummy, and candy cone products. The products are marketed with words such as "magic", "nootropic", and "microdosing". They do not include a full list of ingredients, but are listed as containing a proprietary "mushroom blend". Diamond Shruumz products are sold both online and in some retail stores such as vape shops in the United States.

In 2024, the products were linked to hundreds of poisonings, including deaths, and were recalled. U.S. government agencies have warned consumers not to buy or eat mushroom edibles like Diamond Shruumz and have started to ban their ingredients.

== Ingredients ==
In June 2024, the Food and Drug Administration (FDA) reported that it had identified 4-AcO-DMT, a synthetic and unscheduled psychedelic drug related to psilocybin (4-PO-DMT; the active component of psilocybin mushrooms), in Diamond Shruumz products. Both 4-AcO-DMT and psilocybin are prodrugs of the serotonergic psychedelic psilocin. 4-AcO-DMT is reported to produce similar psychoactive effects as psilocybin but to be slightly less potent by weight and to lack some of the unpleasant side effects such as nausea that can occur with ingestion of psilocybin mushrooms. Muscimol, a constituent of Amanita muscaria mushrooms and an unscheduled GABAergic hallucinogen, has also been identified in Diamond Shruumz products. The products have been found to contain the controlled prescription drug pregabalin (a gabapentinoid) and compounds from kava including desmethoxyyangonin, dihydrokavain, and kavain as well. Different Diamond Shruumz products have been found to have widely varying ingredients.

== Poisonings ==
In August 2024, it was reported that Diamond Shruumz products had caused 145 cases of poisonings, including 59 hospitalizations and at least two deaths. The poisonings have included seizures and have sometimes required intubation or admission into intensive care units. Cases of illness from Diamond Shruumz products had been reported across 29 states. The poisonings were first reported in early June 2024. The specific ingredients responsible for the toxic reactions are unclear. It has been said that none of the identified constituents can explain the severe illnesses that have been observed. However, Prophet Premium Blends blamed toxic levels of muscimol and issued a recall of all of its Diamond Shruumz products. Nonetheless, by November 2024, the totals had increased to 180 cases of poisonings, 73 hospitalizations, and 3 deaths across 34 states. The FDA found muscimol in only a subset of the products and has maintained that muscimol cannot explain all of the observed symptoms. Another possibility is that the symptoms may be due to poisoning with concomitant ibotenic acid, a neurotoxin and another component of Amanita muscaria. This compound has not yet been identified in Diamond Shruumz products, but testing for it is said to be difficult.

== Regulation ==
The FDA has warned consumers not to buy or eat Diamond Shruumz products and businesses not to sell the products. In December 2024, the FDA formally banned the use of the Amanita muscaria constituents muscimol, ibotenic acid, and muscarine in food products.

== See also ==
- Psychedelic mushroom store
