= Psilocybin decriminalization in the United States =

Movement to decriminalize psilocybin in the United States

Poster used to promote Ordinance 301. In May 2019, Denver became the first U.S. city to decriminalize psilocybin.

In the United States, psilocybin is classified as a Schedule I substance under the Controlled Substances Act, which prohibits its use, sale, and possession under federal law. Despite this, campaigns to decriminalize and legalize the medical use of psilocybin have succeeded in several jurisdictions since 2019.

Denver became the first city to decriminalize psilocybin in May 2019, followed by Oakland in June 2019, Santa Cruz, California in January 2020, and Washington, D.C. in November 2020. Oregon voters passed two ballot measures in 2020, making it the first state to legalize the supervised use of psilocybin and decriminalize possession of all drugs, including psilocybin. Colorado followed with a similar medical use and decriminalization measure in 2022. Since then, reforms have been enacted in more jurisdictions across the U.S.

== Background ==
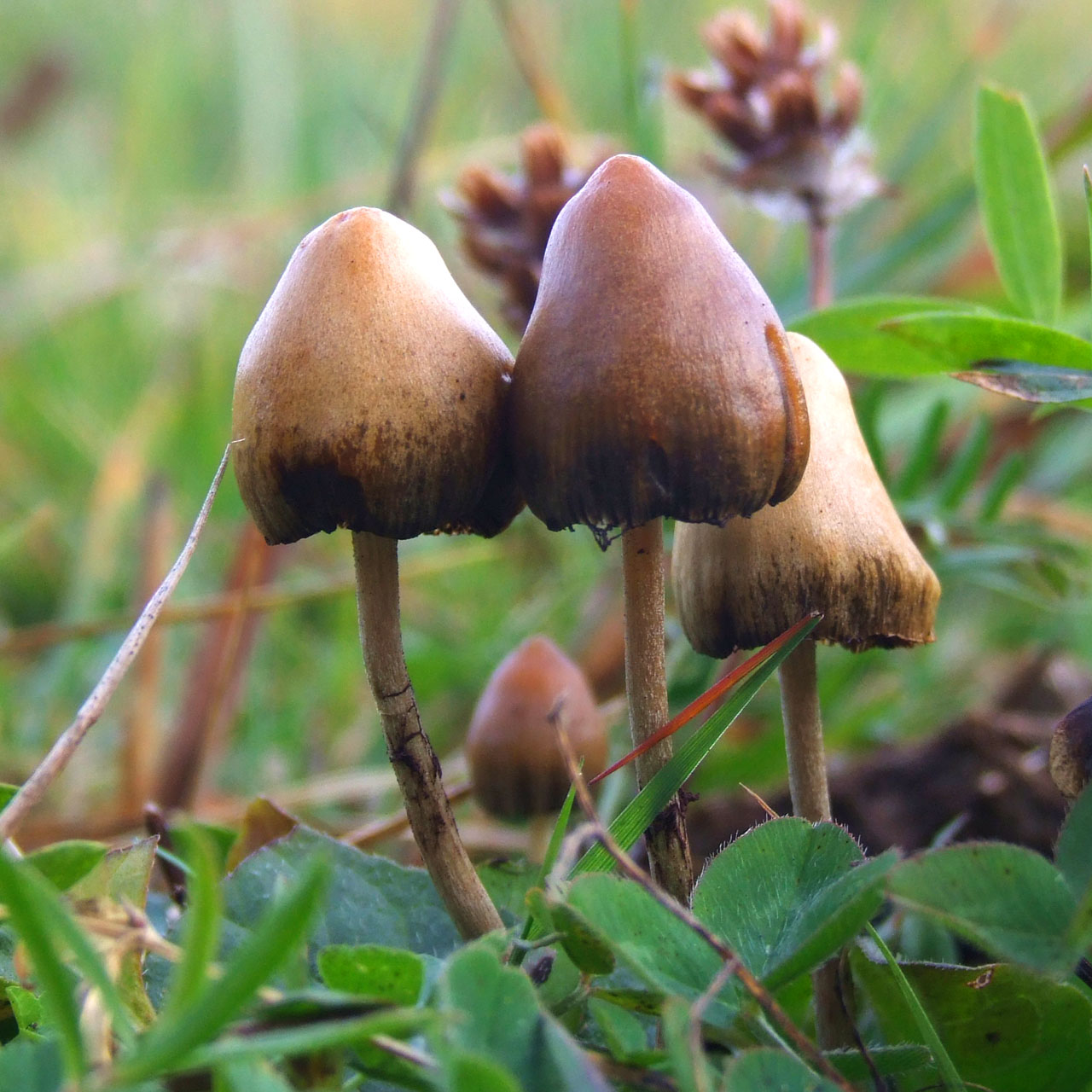
Psilocybe semilanceata, a psilocybin mushroom species commonly sold in the United States.

Psilocybin is a psychedelic drug produced naturally by psilocybin mushrooms, commonly known as "magic mushrooms." In the United States, it was banned in 1970 by the Controlled Substances Act. Under this act, psilocybin is classified as a Schedule I controlled substance that has "no accepted medical use and a high potential for abuse." In the 2005 case of State of New Mexico vs David Ray Pratt, New Mexico's Court of Appeals found that if one grows psilocybin mushrooms for personal use, it is not considered "manufacturing of a controlled substance" under state law.

In February 2019, Troy Farah of Wired reported on two grassroots movements in Oregon and the city of Denver, Colorado, that were pushing for the decriminalization of psilocybin. Advocates for decriminalizing psilocybin have formed their movement based on the rapid legalization of cannabis in the United States. As of August 2024, decriminalization efforts have not included synthetic psychedelics such as lysergic acid diethylamide (LSD) and MDMA. American author Michael Pollan, writing for The New York Times, criticized the movement for being a premature push, "before the researchers have completed their work". He wrote, "We still have a lot to learn about the immense power and potential risk of these molecules, not to mention the consequences of unrestricted use." At the same time, he urged that "no one should ever be arrested or go to jail for the possession or cultivation of any kind of mushroom." Pollan acknowledged the low risks of the drug's use, but cited a survey that nearly eight percent of people needed psychiatric treatment after experiencing a bad trip. His end goal however is legalization not just for psilocybin therapy: "I look forward to the day when psychedelic medicines like psilocybin, having proven their safety and efficacy in F.D.A.-approved trials, will take their legal place in society, not only in mental health care but in the lives of people dealing with garden-variety unhappiness or interested in spiritual exploration and personal growth."

In May 2018, Donald Trump signed the Right to Try Act, with certain doctors suggesting that it allows terminally ill patients to use psychedelics for treatment. In October 2018, the Food and Drug Administration granted psilocybin "breakthrough therapy" status for research. The drug was granted this status again in November 2019. Decriminalization advocates have cited research that suggests that the drug is non-addictive and causes a low amount of emergency visits when compared to other illegal drugs. Other research has indicated the potential beneficial use of psilocybin in treating treatment-resistant depression and nicotine dependence. Advocates have also claimed that decriminalization would redirect law enforcement's attention and limited resources from policing private psychedelic usage, to higher priorities affecting the general public (e.g. violent crime).

== Legality ==
Legality of psilocybin in the United States Legal for supervised medical use and decriminalized Legal for supervised medical use Decriminalized States with decriminalized cities or counties Fully illegal

=== Decriminalization ===
In May 2019, Denver, Colorado, became the first city in the United States to decriminalize psilocybin mushrooms after a ballot initiative narrowly won with 50.6% of the vote. The initiative did not legalize mushrooms but prohibited Denver from spending any resources to prosecute people for their use or possession. The law applies to adults aged 21 and over, and psilocybin remained illegal in the rest of Colorado until the official implementation of decriminalization in law across the whole state on December 27, 2022, after the passing of the state-wide Proposition 122 initiative on November 28, 2022.

The following month in June 2019, 130 individuals testified over two days to the city council in Oakland, California, about their prior experiences with psilocybin and other entheogens. This was the origin of the Decriminalize Nature movement. Following the testimonies, the city council unanimously voted to decriminalize mushrooms with psilocybin and psilocin, along with other naturally derived psychedelics like plants with ibogaine, plant combinations similar to ayahuasca that have DMT, and plants with mescaline like peyote.

In January 2020, Santa Cruz, California, voted unanimously to decriminalize the adult possession and cultivation of psilocybin and other entheogens, supported by Decriminalize Nature Santa Cruz. Commercial sale of psilocybin is still illegal.

In September 2020, the City Council of Ann Arbor, Michigan, voted unanimously in favor of a resolution brought forward by Decriminalize Nature Ann Arbor declaring the investigation or arrest of anyone for planting, cultivating, purchasing, transporting, distributing, engaging in practices with or possessing entheogenic plants or plant compounds to be the city's lowest law enforcement priority.

In November 2020, the state of Oregon became the first U.S. state to both decriminalize psilocybin and also legalize it for supervised non-medical use after Ballot Measures 109 and 110 passed. However, the Oregon Legislature repealed the decriminalization component of Ballot Measure 110 in 2024. Furthermore, following the passage of Measure 109 in 2020, multiple counties and cities voted to block its implementation. As of 2023, psilocybin therapy in Oregon is permitted in Benton, Columbia, Deschutes, Hood River, Jackson, Lane, Lincoln, Multnomah, Wasco, Washington, and Yamhill counties.

In November 2020, the District of Columbia passed initiative 81; the short title of the initiative was the Entheogenic Plant and Fungus Policy Act of 2020 and it came into effect on March 15, 2021. It decriminalizes psilocybin drugs, which are psychedelics including magic mushrooms, ayahuasca, and mescaline, making arrests for their possession or use the lowest priority for DC police.

In January 2021, Washtenaw County, Michigan, followed suit. That same month, the City Council of Somerville, Massachusetts, supported by Decriminalize Nature Somerville voted unanimously to decriminalize the possession of entheogenic plants, including psilocybin mushrooms and ibogaine.

In February 2021, after continuous outreach by Decriminalize Nature Massachusetts and Bay Staters for Natural Medicine, the City Council of Cambridge, Massachusetts, and in March 2021, Northampton, Massachusetts, followed.

In October 2021, the City Council of Seattle, Washington, and Arcata, California, voted unanimously to deprioritize enforcing entheogen prohibition.

On October 20, 2021, the City Council of Easthampton, Massachusetts, voted 7–0 on a non-binding resolution to support ending arrests for the growing of entheogenic plants and fungi, as well as to support decriminalization of the possession of most controlled substances.

On November 3, 2021, Detroit voters approved Proposal E, making Detroit the latest city to "decriminalize nature", as supporters call it. Proposal E, a ballot initiative, passed with 61% of voters supporting a law that will, "to the fullest extent permitted under Michigan law", make "the personal possession and therapeutic use of entheogenic plants by adults the city's lowest law-enforcement priority".

On December 20, 2021, the city of Port Townsend, Washington, adopted a resolution requesting that "investigating, arrest, and prosecution of adults engaging in entheogen-related activities, included but not limited to... should be a City of Port Townsend low enforcement priority when done in a nonpublic place".

On March 22, 2022, Hazel Park became the third Michigan city to decriminalize natural psychedelics with the support of Decriminalize Nature Hazel Park.

On September 7, 2022, San Francisco Board of Supervisors unanimously approved a measure calling for the decriminalization of the use of entheogenic plants with the support of Decriminalize Nature San Francisco.

In March 2022, Colorado activists picked a psychedelic reform initiative (Proposition 122) out of three other similar initiatives and started a signature campaign to place the measure on the state's 2022 election ballot. By July 2022, the reform initiative made the Colorado ballot for the 2022 midterm elections. The ballot initiative was passed in November 2022 by over 50% of those who voted. The proposition was for the decriminalization of the possession, growing, and sharing of five psychedelics for personal use: psilocybin, psilocyn, dimethyltryptamine (DMT), ibogaine, and mescaline, for those aged 21-years-old and over. The initiative also included the legalization of "healing centers" that are licensed by the state's Department of Regulatory Agencies, where those aged 21 and over can buy, consume, and take psychedelics under supervision. It will at first only include psilocybin but allows for expansion to include DMT, ibogaine, and mescaline in 2026. On July 1, 2023, the state created the Natural Medicine Advisory Board and a division within the Department of Revenue for regulating and licensing the listed fungi and plants. The Department of Revenue's Natural Medicine Division issued Colorado's first healing center business license on March 31, 2025. The first healing center in Colorado opened in July 2025.

On February 27, 2023, Ferndale, Michigan, became the fourth city in Michigan to decriminalize entheogenic plants and fungi supported by Decriminalize Nature Ferndale.

In May 2023, Jefferson County, Washington, decriminalized the use of entheogenic plants and fungi.

On July 11, 2023, Berkeley, California, became the fifth city in California to decriminalize entheogenic plants and fungi with the support of Decriminalize Nature Berkeley.

On July 23, 2023, Minneapolis, Minnesota, decriminalized entheogenic plants and fungi via mayoral executive order.

On October 3, 2023, the City Council in Portland, Maine, has voted to deprioritize the local enforcement of laws against psychedelic plants and fungi.

In October 2023, 'Massachusetts for Mental Health Options' received approval from the state attorney general to pursue a ballot initiative in Massachusetts for the 2024 elections. The initiative sought to legalize the personal use of psychedelics, including the home cultivation of entheogenic plants and fungi. However, it was rejected by voters, with 57.1% voting no.

On January 9, 2024, the City Council in Ypsilanti, Michigan, effectively decriminalizes entheogens through the advocacy of Decriminalize Nature Ypsilanti

On August 13, 2024, the City Council in Olympia, Washington, decriminalized plant-based hallucinogens, including psilocybin mushrooms with the support of Decriminalize Nature Olympia.

On January 28, 2025, the City Council in Tacoma, Washington, decriminalized natural psychedelics containing tryptamines, phenethylamines, and indolamines.

On December 16, 2025, the City Council in Jackson, Michigan effectively decriminalized entheogens through the advocacy of Decriminalize Nature Jackson, the sixth city in Michigan

On March 24, 2026, the County Council in King County, Washington, voted to deprioritize the personal use of psychedelic substances, including psilocybin, as well as state its support for continued research for entheogen-related alternative treatments and the full decriminalization of the personal use of entheogens at the state and federal level.

On August 26, 2026 the City Council of Nevada City, California effectively decriminalized entheogens, the seventh city in California with the support of Decriminalize Nature Nevada City.

On September 1, 2026, the Council Council in Pierce County, Washington, unanimously voted to deprioritize personal use of natural psychedelics, including psilocybin.

=== Supported adult use ===
On May 26, 2020, Oregon state initiatives to legalize supervised adult use of psilocybin (Measure 109) and decriminalize drug possession (Measure 110) qualified to appear on the ballot in November. On November 3, 2020, both measures were approved by voters, but the drug decriminalization provision of Measure 110 was repealed by the legislature in 2024. Measure 109 created Oregon Psilocybin Services, a state agency responsible for regulating legal psilocybin use in Oregon.

The Division of Natural Medicine is the state agency that implements Colorado's legal psilocybin program. On March 24, 2025, Colorado State Regulators issued the first sets of Licenses for Medical Assisted Use. The dawn of state-regulated psychedelic mushrooms has arrived in Colorado, nearly two years since Oregon began offering them. The mushrooms are a Schedule I drug and illegal under federal law except for clinical research. But more than a dozen cities nationwide have deprioritized or decriminalized them in the past five years, and many eyes are turned toward Oregon's and Colorado's state-regulated programs. "In Oregon and Colorado, we're going to learn a lot about administration of psychedelics outside of clinical, religious and underground settings because they're the first to try this in the U.S.," said William R. Smith, an assistant professor of psychiatry at the University of North Carolina School of Medicine.

On April 8, 2025, New Mexico's governor signed a bill into law to establish a therapeutic psilocybin program in the state. Weeks after the proposal from Sen. Jeff Steinborn (D) advanced through the legislature, Gov. Michelle Lujan Grisham (D) gave it final approval on Monday. The Medical Psilocybin Act will allow patients with certain qualifying conditions to access the psychedelic and use it under the guidance of a licensed healthcare provider.

== By state ==
Psilocybin decriminalization by state and city
State or D.C.	City	Possession	Medical	Effective date
California	Oakland	Decriminalized	Illegal	June 2019
California	Santa Cruz	Decriminalized	Illegal	January 2020
California	Arcata	Decriminalized	Illegal	October 2021
California	San Francisco	Decriminalized	Illegal	September 7, 2022
California	Berkeley	Decriminalized	Illegal	July 11, 2023
California	Eureka	Decriminalized	Illegal	October 18, 2023
California	Nevada City	Decriminalized	Illegal	August 26, 2026
Colorado	Statewide	Decriminalized	Adult use	December 27, 2022
District of Columbia	Washington D.C.	Decriminalized	Illegal	March 15, 2021
Maine	Portland	Decriminalized	Illegal	October 3, 2023
Massachusetts	Somerville	Decriminalized	Illegal	January 2021
Massachusetts	Cambridge	Decriminalized	Illegal	February 2021
Massachusetts	Northampton	Decriminalized	Illegal	March 2021
Massachusetts	Easthampton	Decriminalized	Illegal	October 20, 2021
Massachusetts	Amherst	Decriminalized	Illegal	July 18, 2022
Massachusetts	Salem	Decriminalized	Illegal	May 2023
Massachusetts	Provincetown	Decriminalized	Illegal	December 2023
Massachusetts	Medford	Decriminalized	Illegal	February 2024
Michigan	Ann Arbor	Decriminalized	Illegal	September 2020
Michigan	Washtenaw County	Decriminalized	Illegal	January 2021
Michigan	Detroit	Decriminalized	Illegal	November 3, 2021
Michigan	Hazel Park	Decriminalized	Illegal	March 22, 2022
Michigan	Ferndale	Decriminalized	Illegal	February 27, 2023
Michigan	Ypsilanti	Decriminalized	Illegal	January 2024
Michigan	Jackson	Decriminalized	Illegal	December 16, 2025
Minnesota	Minneapolis	Decriminalized	Illegal	July 21, 2023
New Mexico	Statewide	Legalized with a therapist or licensed facilitator.	Assisted adult use	April 8, 2025
Oregon	Statewide	Legalized with a therapist or licensed facilitator.	Assisted adult use	November 3, 2020
Washington	Seattle	Decriminalized	Illegal	October 2021
Washington	Port Townsend	Decriminalized	Illegal	December 20, 2021
Washington	Jefferson County	Decriminalized	Illegal	May 2023
Washington	Olympia	Decriminalized	Illegal	August 14, 2024
Washington	Tacoma	Decriminalized	Illegal	January 28, 2025
Washington	King County	Decriminalized	Illegal	March 24, 2026
Washington	Pierce County	Decriminalized	Illegal	September 1, 2026

== Ongoing efforts ==
A 2018 effort to decriminalize psilocybin in California failed to garner enough signatures. In February 2019, Iowa state lawmaker Jeff Shipley introduced two bills that would legalize medical psilocybin and remove the drug from the state's list of controlled substances. In June 2019, Representative Alexandria Ocasio-Cortez proposed legislation that would remove restrictions placed on researching the medical use of psilocybin. By November 2019, nearly 100 U.S. cities were reportedly considering measures to decriminalize psilocybin.

In January 2020, a Vermont state lawmaker, along with three other co-sponsors, introduced a bill to decriminalize psilocybin, peyote, ayahuasca, and kratom. On May 26, 2020, an initiative in Oregon to legalize supervised psilocybin use qualified to appear on the ballot in November. Another initiative in Oregon would decriminalize drug possession and expand treatment services. In May 2020, New York Assemblywoman Linda Rosenthal introduced a decriminalization bill, citing ongoing medical research and successful efforts in Denver, Oakland, and Santa Cruz, and filed further bills regarding psychedelics in the following years. In November 2020, New Jersey senator Nicholas Scutari added an amendment to a marijuana decriminalization bill that would decriminalize up to one ounce of psilocybin.

In November 2020, California Senator Scott Wiener introduced a bill to decriminalize psychedelics such as psilocybin, ayahuasca, ibogaine, and LSD. In April 2021, the bill was approved by the Senate Public Safety Committee and the Health Committee, and in May 2021, it was cleared by the Senate Appropriations Committee and approved by the California Senate. In June 2021, the bill was approved by the Assembly Public Safety Committee, and in July 2021, it was cleared by the Assembly Health Committee. In December 2022, it was re-introduced in a slightly modified form as Senate Bill 58, which does not include MDMA or LSD, which were both included in the earlier attempt under SB519. On September 7, 2023, Senate Bill 58 passed in the California Legislature but was quickly vetoed by California Governor Gavin Newsom on October 7, 2023.

In September 2021, Michigan senators Jeff Irwin and Adam Hollier introduced SB631, which would create exemptions in the Michigan Health Code allowing personal and communal use, possession, cultivation, transportation and delivery of naturally occurring substances. It is the first of "Decriminalize Nature" led efforts that would allow financial gain for services that utilize these substances. SB 631 was assigned to the Michigan Senate Judiciary and Public Safety Committee but did not advance.

In November 2021, activists were advancing reform among others in Grand Rapids, Michigan.

On January 5, 2022, Washington State legislators proposed Senate Bill 5660 which would legalize psilocybin for "supported use" among adults over 21.

For the 2023 session, lawmakers in eleven states are pursuing psychedelics reform legislation.

On September 7, 2023, Senate Bill 58 was passed by the California Senate with 21 ayes and 14 noes. This bill would have decriminalized the possession and use of small amounts of psilocybin and psilocin (among some other psychedelics) for adults aged 21 and above. However, it was vetoed by Governor Gavin Newsom on October 7, who urged the legislature to send him legislation that includes therapeutic guidelines.

A bill introduced in May 2024, by New York State Representative Amy Paulin would allow people 18 and older to undergo a health screening, take an educational course, and pass a test to obtain a permit to grow mushrooms or purchase psilocybin from licensed vendors.

Since the start of the 2025 legislative session, more than 36 psychedelics-related bills have been introduced across more than a dozen states.

== Public opinion ==
In January 2019, the Oregon Psilocybin Society and research firm DHM Research found that 47 percent of Oregon voters supported the legalization of medical psilocybin, while 46 percent opposed it. The percentage of voters in favor increased to 64 percent after key elements of the ballot were clarified to the poll's participants. In November 2020, a ballot measure to legalize medical psilocybin passed with 55.8% of voters in favor.

An October 2019 online poll conducted by research firm Green Horizons found that 38 percent of U.S. adults supported legalizing psilocybin "under at least some circumstances."

According to a survey in Washington, D.C., done at the beginning of September 2020, voters support the initiative to decriminalize psychedelic plants and fungi. The number of voters in favor increased by nine percentage points since April 2020. A key factor, respondents reported, is that they have learned more about the legislation in question. While 60 percent of participants said they would vote "yes" for Initiative 81, 24 percent said they planned to vote "no," and 16 percent remained undecided. In November 2020, on Election Day, 76 percent of voters in Washington, D.C., voted in favor of the initiative.

A UC Berkeley Psychedelics Survey published in July 2023 suggested that 61% of registered voters in the U.S. support legalizing regulated therapeutic access to psychedelics. It also suggested that almost half (49%) of registered voters in the U.S. are in support of the decriminalization of personal use and possession of psychedelics.

== See also ==
- Legal status of psychedelic drugs in the United States
- Legal status of psilocybin mushrooms
- Timeline of psychedelic legalization and decriminalization
