= October 2010 raid on smart drug shops in Poland =

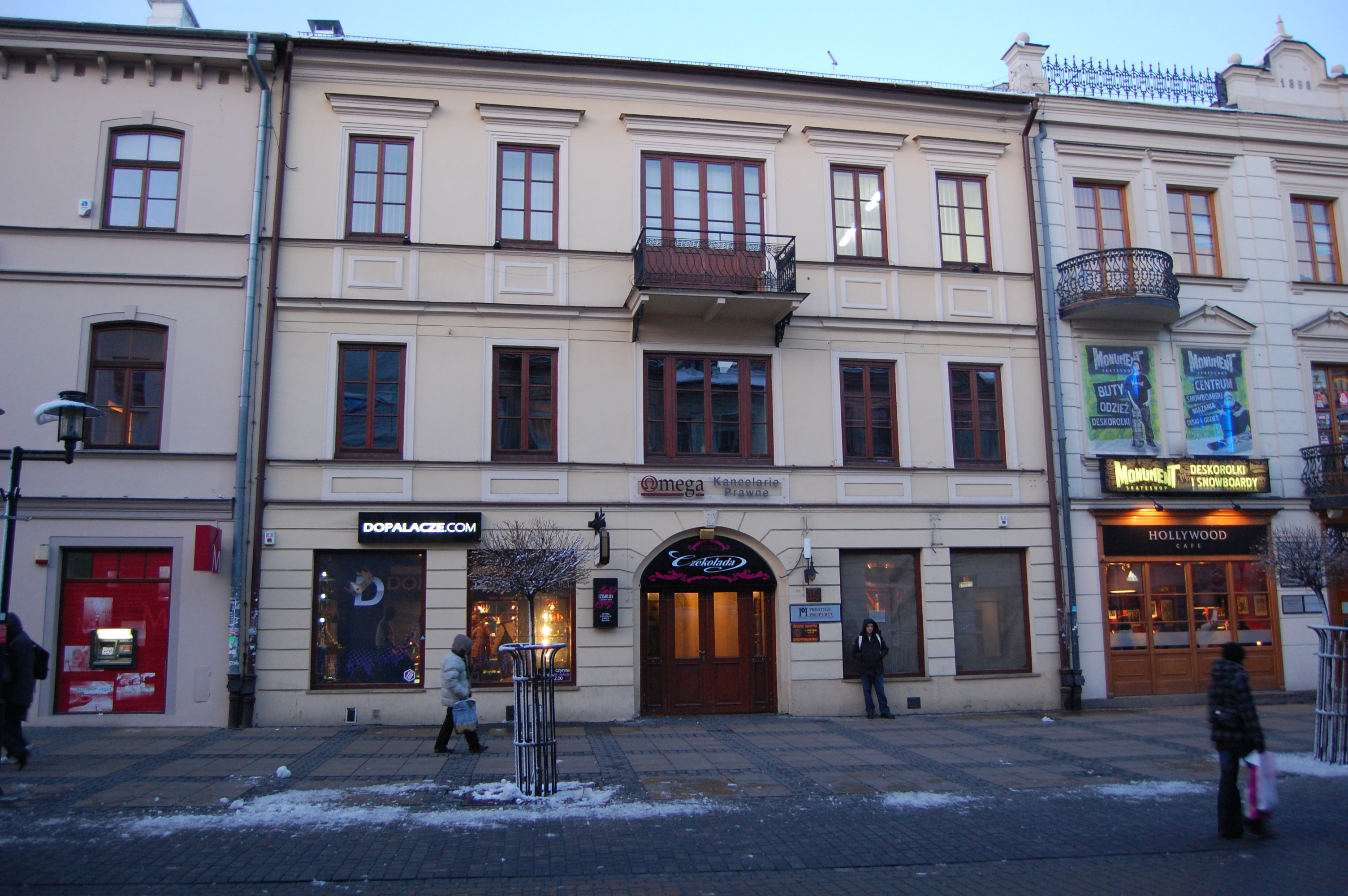
Dopalacze.com smart shop in Lublin

On 2 October 2010, the Poland's State Health Inspectorate (Główny Inspektorat Sanitarny) in a controversial decision, closed down and sealed off almost 1400 retail smart shops specializing in the off sales of psychoactive substances in Poland. A few weeks following the operation, a law was passed to criminalise all open sales of psychotropic and mind-altering drugs, including those not on the government list of banned psychotropic drugs in Poland. Some of the drugs previously sold at smart shops were banned earlier in March 2009 (benzylpiperazine, Salvia divinorum) and 2010 (mephedrone).

The decision was personally supported by the Polish prime minister Donald Tusk, who said: "In the war against drugs, if need be, we will act at the border of law." ("W walce z dopalaczami, jak będzie trzeba, będziemy działać na granicy prawa"). According to statistics of the Ministry of Health, the initiative brought almost immediate positive results. The number of patients hospitalized at toxicology departments went down to only 16 patients countrywide between 14–18 October 2010. Before 14 October there were 18 deaths from overdose alone.

The fight against designer drugs is the Polish European Union Presidency's top priority in the area of home affairs and Polish government plans. After closing down existing retail smart shops, the Polish government wants to create an EU-wide law to ban designer drugs, especially the internet sale of them.

== See also ==
- Designer drug
- Operation Web Tryp
