= J-CODE =

FBI operation targeting illegal opioid distribution on the Internet

J-CODE (Joint Criminal Opioid Darknet Enforcement) was an FBI operation announced by U.S. Attorney General Jeff Sessions on January 29, 2018, in Pittsburgh, Pennsylvania which targeted illegal opioid distribution on the Darknet. Given the integrity and robustness of the hidden services of the Tor anonymity network, however, sting operations, the seizure of servers, the tracking of postal deliveries, and in general the exploitation of failures of operational security were expected to be standard operating procedure.
