= Legal status of psychedelic drugs =

The legal status of psychedelic drugs is discussed in the following articles:

- Decriminalize Nature
- Legal status of psilocybin mushrooms
- Psilocybin decriminalization in the United States
- Legal status of ayahuasca by country
- Legal status of psychoactive cacti by country
- Legal status of psychedelic drugs in the United States
- Legal status of psychedelic drugs in the United Kingdom
- Legal status of psychedelic drugs in Canada
- Timeline of psychedelic legalization and decriminalization
