= Psychoactive Substances Bill =

Psychoactive Substances Bill can refer to the following parliamentary bills:

- the New Zealand parliament bill which became the Psychoactive Substances Act 2013
- the Unitred Kingdom parliament bill which became the Psychoactive Substances Act 2016
