= Legal status of Salvia divinorum =

Psychoactive plant, legal in most countries

Salvia divinorum, a psychoactive plant, is legal in most countries. Exceptions, countries where there is some form of control, include Australia, Belgium, Brazil, Canada, Denmark, Estonia, Finland, France, Germany, Iceland, Ireland, Italy, India, Japan, South Korea, Norway, Poland, the United Kingdom, Ukraine, Slovakia, Spain, Sweden, Vietnam, Armenia and 33 states and territories of the United States.

In the United Kingdom, following a local newspaper story in October 2005, a parliamentary Early Day Motion was raised calling for Salvia divinorum to be banned there. However, it only received 11 signatures. A second Early Day Motion was raised in October 2008 attracting 18 signatures. The Advisory Council on the Misuse of Drugs, the independent body that advises UK government on drugs, was asked to investigate further. On the 28 January 2016, the Psychoactive Substances Act 2016 was passed. The act came into force on 26 May 2016, across the entire United Kingdom, making Salvia illegal to possess with intent to supply, possess on custodial premises, supply, import for human consumption, or produce for human consumption. The two sponsors for the bill were Conservative House of Lords member Michael Bates and Conservative MP Theresa May.

In such places where Salvia divinorum legislation exists, it varies in prohibitive degree from country to country. Australia has imposed its strictest 'Schedule 9' (US Schedule I equivalent or equivalent to class A in the UK) classification, for example, and Italy has also placed Salvia in its 'Table I' of controlled substances (also US Schedule I and class A equivalent). In Spain there are just controls focusing on the commercial trade of Salvia divinorum, and private cultivation (growing one's own plants for non-commercial use) is not targeted.

In the United States, Salvia is not regulated under the Controlled Substances Act but some states, including Delaware, Illinois, Louisiana, Missouri, Virginia, Tennessee, Texas, and others, have passed their own laws. Several other states have proposed legislation against Salvia, including Alabama, Alaska, California, Florida, Georgia, Iowa, New Jersey, New York, Ohio, Oregon, and Pennsylvania. Many of these proposals have not made it into law, with motions having failed, stalled or otherwise died, for example at committee review stages.

National legislation for amendment of the Controlled Substances Act to place salvinorin A and Salvia divinorum in Schedule I at the federal level was proposed in 2002 by Representative Joe Baca (D – California). Those opposed to bill HR 5607 include Daniel Siebert, who sent a letter to Congress arguing against the proposed legislation, and the Center for Cognitive Liberty & Ethics (CCLE), who sent key members of the US Congress a report on Salvia divinorum and its active principle, along with letters from an array of scientists who expressed concern that scheduling Salvia divinorum would negatively impact important research on the plant. The bill did not pass.

Salvia cultivation may prove difficult to police. The plant has a nondescript appearance; unlike cannabis the leaves are not distinctive and it does not have a distinctive odour. Salvia divinorum looks like, and can also be grown as, an ordinary houseplant without the need of special equipment such as hydroponics or designated lights.

== Opinions and arguments ==
Concerns expressed by some politicians on the subject of Salvia echo those of the media. In November 2006, the morning after a story by news channel KSL was aired in Utah, warning its viewers about what it called "this dangerous herb", Utah State Representative Paul Ray (R) submitted a bill calling for its Schedule I classification in that state. KSL TV cameras were on Capitol Hill to see the paperwork filed, with KSL reporting - "Moments after our story ended, Utah Representative Paul Ray began writing a bill to ban Salvia." As he presented the bill Ray said - "It was upsetting to see we have a drug of that strength that's legal." and "We're basically going to make it illegal to possess or sell. Period." Ray's action was further supported by the news channel in a subsequent KSL editorial. Viewer feedback was unanimously more critical.

Georgia State Senator John Bulloch (R) reportedly saw a report on an Atlanta television news station about the increased use of Salvia divinorum. He was quoted as saying - "I thought, 'Why hasn't somebody already jumped on this?" before filing Senate Bill 295. "I hurriedly got legislative counsel to draft the bill.... Everything that I read about it is it's considered to be a hallucinogenic drug.... A lot of the reading that I've found on it says that it gives a quicker and more intense high than LSD." Senator Don Thomas (R) was reported as saying -"I just know about the publicity of the dangers of it, and the use of it, so my first impression is to ban anything of that nature."

In February 2007, the day after a Fox TV local news story on Salvia had aired in Milwaukee, Wisconsin state lawmaker Sheldon Wasserman (D), also a licensed physician, who had never heard of it before, spoke to Fox news in a follow-up report about then wanting to make it a Schedule I controlled substance.

Comparisons to LSD and particular focus on "protecting our children" are also echoed by politicians. In June 2007 the Wisconsin State Journal newspaper ran a front-page headline cover story about Salvia, reporting that Representative Wasserman had recently begun seeking sponsors for a bill that would ban the manufacture and sale of Salvia divinorum for consumption in Wisconsin. Dr. Wasserman was reported as saying - "This bill is all about protecting our children" and "I want to stop the Salvia divinorum dealers who are pushing young people to experiment with a potentially dangerous substance."

In connection with his proposals to make Salvia divinorum and salvinorin A Schedule I controlled substances in Oregon, Representative John Lim (R) was quoted as saying - "From what I understand this drug is at least as dangerous as marijuana or LSD", and Seth Hatmaker, a spokesman for Lim - "I think it's only a matter of time before we find people addicted to this stuff".

In the state of Illinois, in support of his bill for Schedule I classification of Salvia divinorum, Representative Dennis Reboletti (R) wrote in his own website that Salvia is a "powerful psychoactive plant which in appearance looks like marijuana but has the psychoactive properties of LSD." and "It's important that we in the legislature are proactive in protecting our children from highly addictive substances" [...] "For a drug to be classified as a Schedule 1 substance signifies that it's a highly dangerous and potentially lethal drug for its user. Hopefully, the passage of my bill will bring attention to "Magic Mint" and help law enforcement combat the future rise of this drug."

Other references and sources indicate however that Salvia divinorum does not look like marijuana. Its psychoactive properties are not like those of LSD, and that Salvia divinorum is not generally understood to be either addictive or toxic.

Concerns about driving while under the influence of Salvia have also been expressed. Delaware State Senator Karen Peterson (D), who introduced Schedule I classification of Salvia divinorum in Delaware, said - "I, for one, don't want to be driving down Route 1 next to someone who is having an out-of-body experience" and "I thought this is not something that I would want people using driving around the streets of Delaware."

There has not been any evidence to suggest that Salvia use is problematic. Some "arguments" against Salvia have been of a preventative or imitative nature. North Dakota State Senator Randy Christmann (R) stated - "we need to stop this before it gets to be a huge problem not after it gets to be a huge problem" and New Jersey Assemblyman Jack Conners (D) argued -"Salvia divinorum use may not be a runway epidemic, but it's certainly is a phenomenon that warrants attention. We should take preventive steps now to prevent wholesale problems later on" In October 2005 MP John Mann raised an ultimately unsuccessful Early Day Motion calling for Salvia divinorum to be banned in the UK, saying - "The Australians have clearly found a problem with it. There's obviously a risk in people taking it."

The National Institute on Money in State Politics indicates the major sources of campaign contributions for US politicians. For example, Oregon State Representative John Lim's largest individual campaign sponsor in 2006 was the Oregon Beer & Wine Distributors Association. Lim argued for Schedule I classification of Salvia in Oregon. Senator Karen Peterson's second largest group campaign donations in 2006 came from 'Beer, Wine & Liquor' industries. Peterson introduced Schedule I classification of Salvia divinorum in Delaware. Tennessee State Senator Tim Burchett (R) sponsored Salvia legislation in Tennessee. In 2006 his second largest individual campaign donation came from the Tennessee Malt Beverage Association. In the same period alcohol and tobacco related contributions amounted to the fourth largest industry contributions for Representative Paul Ray in Utah. Alcohol related contributions also featured highly for Representative Dennis Reboletti in Illinois - 'Beer, Wine & Liquor' was his seventh highest industry contributor.

Opponents of more prohibitive measures against Salvia argue that such reactions are largely due to an inherent prejudice and a particular cultural bias rather than any actual balance of evidence, pointing out inconsistencies in attitudes toward other more toxic and addictive drugs such as alcohol and nicotine. The worldwide number of alcohol-related deaths is calculated at over 2,000 people per day, in the US the number is over 300 deaths per day. While not objecting to some form of legal control, in particular with regard to the sale to minors or sale of enhanced high-strength extracts, most Salvia proponents otherwise argue against stricter legislation.

Those advocating consideration of Salvia divinorum's potential for beneficial use in a modern context have two major arguments: First that Salvia Divinorum is a potent kappa opioid agonist and given its activity and modulatory effect on the kappa opioid receptor, and therefore similarity of its profile of effect to ibogaine, (used successfully to treat addiction around the world) that further research into its potential as a potent anti-addiction medication will be hindered by careless lawmaking. Secondly, advocates argue that more could be learned from Mazatec culture, where Salvia is not really associated with notions of drug taking at all and it is rather considered as a spiritual sacrament. In light of this it is argued that Salvia divinorum could be better understood more positively as an entheogen rather than pejoratively as a hallucinogen. Other entheogenic plants with continuing traditions principally of spiritual use include peyote (and other psychoactive cacti), iboga, virola, ayahuasca (an admixture of plants containing DMT + MAOI), and various types of psychoactive fungi. In fact, US legislation as it stands specifically allows two of these to be used in a spiritual context. The Native American Church is allowed to use peyote and União do Vegetal (or UDV) is permitted ayahuasca. Although not consistently granted (varying from state to state), the principal grounds for such concessions are constitutional, with further grounds following from the Religious Freedom Restoration Act.

== List by country ==
| Country | Possession | Sale | Transport | Cultivation | Notes |
|---|---|---|---|---|---|
| Armenia | Illegal | Illegal | Illegal | Illegal | |
| Austria | Legal | Legal | Legal | Legal | Salvia divinorum is completely legal in Austria without any restrictions. The supreme court of Austria decided that Salvia Divinorum is not affected by the "Neue Psychoaktive Substanzen" act, which bans the sale and possession of research chemicals for the purpose of human consumption. The court ruled that the law only includes chemical, unnatural substances. |
| Australia | Illegal | Illegal | Illegal | Illegal | As of 1 June 2002, Australia became the first country to ban Salvia and salvinorin. According to the Australian Drugs and Poisons Committee, salvia had not yet shown evidence of damage or threat to public health/safety but had potential to be abused. In a statement which has been criticized as self-negating the committee said, "there was no evidence of traditional therapeutic use other than in shamanistic healing rituals". On 1 June 2008, the state of Queensland made Salvia divinorum a schedule 2 dangerous drug, in the same category as cannabis sativa and GHB. |
| Belgium | Illegal | Illegal | Illegal | Illegal | In October 2004, "salvorin A", a misspelling of salvinorin A, was added to the Belgian list of illegal products, so the law was actually banning a non-existent substance. Two years later, in October 2006, the mistake was corrected, and the whole Salvia divinorum plant was made explicitly illegal. |
| Brazil | Illegal | Illegal | Illegal | Illegal | Salvia is illegal in Brazil since 2012. |
| Bulgaria | Illegal | Illegal | Illegal | Illegal | Salvia divinorum became illegal in November 2011. |
| Canada | Legal | Illegal | Illegal | Illegal | As of April 2023, Salvia is controlled under Schedule IV of the Controlled Drugs and Substances Act. Activities such as sale and production of salvia are illegal unless authorized for medical, scientific or industrial purposes. However it is legal for personal use. |
| Chile | Legal | Illegal | Illegal | Legal | "On 8 August 2007, the Chilean government issued a decree making the trafficking of Salvia divinorum and salvinorin A illegal." |
| Croatia | Illegal | Illegal | Illegal | Illegal | Salvia divinorum was banned in Croatia in April 2008 by addition to the official list of illegal substances and plants. |
| Czech Republic | Illegal | Illegal | Illegal | Illegal | Salvia divinorum was banned by law nr. 106/2011 Coll., effective 22 April 2011, which added it to the list of illegal substances. Holding leaves, plants and extracts containing salvinorin A and growing them is considered illegal. |
| Denmark | Legal medically and scientifically | Legal medically and scientifically | Legal medically and scientifically | Legal medically and scientifically | With effect from 23 August 2003, Salvia divinorum and salvinorin A were classed as 'category B' drugs in Danish law. Category B includes psilocybin mushrooms, cocaine, amphetamine, and several others substances that are only legal for medicinal and scientific purposes. Possession carries a penalty of up to 2 years in prison. |
| Finland | Legal medically | Legal medically | Legal medically | Legal medically | Finland passed legislation in August 2002 making it illegal to import Salvia divinorum without a prescription from a doctor. |
| France | Legal (but not legal to attempt to acquire for use as a drug) | Legal (unless for human consumption) | Legal (unless for human consumption) | Legal (unless for human consumption) | Since 2010, Salvia divinorum has been included in the list of poisonous drugs in France, however the listing only applies when intended for human consumption or advertised as having psychotropic effects. |
| Germany | Illegal | Illegal | Illegal | Illegal | Salvia divinorum was effectively banned in Germany in February 2008 by addition to the official list of illegal substances. Previously the government tried various ways to make Salvia divinorum illegal in Germany. Despite salvia divinorum being illegal, the active substance salvinorin A is however unregulated. |
| Indonesia | Legal | Legal | Legal | Legal | The law in the Republic of Indonesia does not address salvia divinorum. |
| Ireland | Illegal | Illegal | Illegal | Illegal | Salvia divinorum is no longer legal in the Republic of Ireland. Salvinorin A, which is Salvia divinorum's main psychotropic molecule, is listed as a controlled substance in S.I. 552/2011 Misuse of Drugs (Amendment) Regulations, as is "any product whether natural or otherwise including any plant or plant material of any kind or description, which contains any proportion of the said substance". |
| Italy | Illegal | Illegal | Illegal | Illegal | In August 2004, the Italian government decreed salvinorin A "a substance with hallucinogenic properties that may cause conditions of abuse and can manifest latent psychiatric pathologies like acute psychosis and depressive psychosis even in an irreversible way" and put it and the plant Salvia divinorum on their ‘table I’ of outlawed psychotropic substances in March 2005. The Italian government referred to an evaluation of Salvia made by the Italian National Health Institute, assessing it as "a powerful natural hallucinogen" to justify their decision. The Italian Ministry of Heath Decree (in Italian) (Google translated into English). Cultivation of the plant or the possession of more than 0,5 mg of Salvinorin A carries a penalty from 6 to 20 years in prison. |
| Japan | Illegal | Illegal | Illegal | Legal (unless for human consumption) | On April 1, 2007, an amendment to the Pharmaceutic Affairs Law added Salvinorin A as a designated substance and prohibited the possession, sale, transportation and consumption of Salvia Divinorum materials "that can be used immediately on the human body", such as dried or crushed roots, leaves, stems, etc... Cultivation and sale of living plants for ornamental purposes are not prohibited. Control is strict. Breaking the law is punishable by 5 years in prison or a fine of 5 million yen. |
| South Korea | Illegal | Illegal | Illegal | Illegal | Controlled since 2005. |
| Latvia | Illegal | Illegal | Illegal | Illegal | Salvia divinorum was banned in May 2009. |
| Lithuania | Illegal | Illegal | Illegal | Illegal | Salvia divinorum was banned in May 2008. |
| Malaysia | Legal | Legal | Legal | Legal | The law in Malaysia does not prohibit salvia divinorum. |
| Mexico | Legal | Legal | Legal | Legal | Salvia divinorum is completely legal in Mexico without any restrictions. |
| Myanmar | Legal | Legal | Legal | Legal | |
| Netherlands | Legal | Legal | Legal | Legal | Salvia divinorum is entirely legal. |
| New Zealand | Legal (unless for human consumption) | Legal (unless for human consumption) | Legal (unless for human consumption) | Legal (unless for human consumption) | In November 2007 New Zealand National party MP Jacqui Dean called for the government to take action, saying - "Salvia Divinorum is a hallucinogenic drug, which has been banned in Australia, and yet here in New Zealand it continues to be sold freely." and "We’re dealing with a dangerous drug here, with the minister's wait and see approach like playing Russian Roulette with young people's lives." Jacqui Dean has similar concerns about the 'party pill' benzylpiperazine (BZP), over which Associate Health Minister Jim Anderton (Progressive party) has accused her of indulging in political grandstanding, saying - "Perhaps Mrs Dean doesn't subscribe to the idea that any Government must balance the need to act promptly with its responsibilities to act fairly and follow due process, particularly where its actions affect those who are currently acting within existing legal constraints." When questioned by Māori Party MP Tariana Turia, on why she was unwilling to take the same prohibitory line on smoking cigarettes and drinking alcohol as she took on BZP Ms Dean said "Alcohol and tobacco have been with our society for many, many years." In September 2007, the Social Tonics Association of New Zealand (STANZ) called for Jacqui Dean to step down from speaking on drug issues after she demonstrated "a lack of credibility in calling for the ban of dihydrogen monoxide (H_{2}O - i.e. water.)" STANZ Chairman Matt Bowden said - "The DHMO hoax played on the member this week is not a joke, it highlights a serious issue at the heart of drug policy making. Ms Dean demonstrated a ‘ban anything moderately harmful’ reflex. This approach is just downright dangerous." - "Jacqui Dean has clearly demonstrated a lack of credibility in her requests to the Minister to consider banning water; She has also seriously embarrassed her National Party colleagues who can no longer have confidence in her petitions to ban BZP or anything else." As of 18 July 2013 Salvia is illegal to sell in New Zealand without a license under the Psychoactive Substances Act 2013. This act is designed to prohibit any psychoactive substances which have not been approved by the Psychoactive Substances Regulatory Authority. |
| Norway | Prescription drug | Prescription drug | Prescription drug | Prescription drug | Consumption, sale, possession is illegal but since salvia divinorum is a prescription drug, it remains legal, if the proper permissions have been given out. You cannot consume, sell or possess the drug without that permission. |
| Philippines | Illegal | Illegal | Illegal | Illegal | The Dangerous Drugs Board (DDB) of the Philippine Drug Enforcement Agency (PDEA) declared Salvia Divinorum and its extracts and other forms as illegal in its Board Regulation No. 3, on 6 October 2015. |
| Poland | Illegal | Illegal | Illegal | Illegal | The sale, possession and consumption of salvia divinorum (and many other plants and chemicals) have been made illegal in May 2009. , |
| Portugal | Illegal | Illegal | Illegal | Illegal | Salvia divinorum was banned in Portugal in April 2013 by addition to the official list of illegal substances and plants. |
| Romania | Illegal | Illegal | Illegal | Illegal | Salvia divinorum and Salvinorin A-F has been added as an illegal substance under the Law 143/2000 on 10 February 2010. |
| Russia | Legal | Illegal | Illegal | Illegal | Salvia divinorum was banned in the Russian Federation since 31 December 2009. |
| Serbia | Illegal | Illegal | Illegal | Illegal | Salvia divinorum is illegal in Serbia |
| Singapore | Illegal | Illegal | Illegal | Illegal | Salvia divinorum has been made illegal to possess, consume, and sell when the umbrella category New Psychoactive Substances (NPS) were listed as Class A controlled drugs on 1 May 2014. Possession or consumption of NPS carries a punishment of up to 10 years of imprisonment, or S$20,000 fine, or both. |
| Spain | Legal | Illegal | Illegal | Legal | The sale of Salvia divinorum has been illegal since 6 February 2004. The law only prohibits commerce. It does not make possession or use a crime. |
| Sweden | Illegal | Illegal | Illegal | Illegal | Sveriges riksdags health ministry Statens folkhälsoinstitut classified Salvia divinorum and Salvinorin A as "health hazard" under the act Lagen om förbud mot vissa hälsofarliga varor (translated Act on the Prohibition of Certain Goods Dangerous to Health) as of 1 April 2006, in their regulation SFS 2006:167 listed as alla delar av växten Salvia divinorum från vilka salvinorin A inte blivit extraherat och oavsett under vilka benämningar de förekommer, making it illegal to sell or possess. |
| Switzerland | Illegal | Illegal | Illegal | Illegal | Illegal since 2009. |
| Thailand | Legal | Legal | Legal | Legal | As of the latest available data, Salvia Divinorum is not explicitly prohibited or controlled under the law in Thailand. The plant is not listed in the Thai Hazardous Substances List, which is regulated under the Thailand Hazardous Substances Act and managed by various authorities including the Food and Drug Administration. Discussion of Salvia Divinorum in online Thai forums in a gardening context, with no legal implications, also suggests that it is not considered a controlled substance. However, the absence of explicit mention in the controlled substances lists does not necessarily guarantee its legality, and legal status may be subject to change. For the most current and accurate information, it is recommended to consult Thai legal authorities or a legal professional familiar with Thai law. |
| Ukraine | Illegal | Illegal | Illegal | Illegal | Illegal since 2010. |
| United Kingdom | Illegal to possess with intent to supply or possess on custodial premises | Illegal (to supply for human consumption) | Illegal (to import for human consumption) | Illegal (to produce for human consumption) | In September 2001, in answer to a parliamentary question from Ann Widdecombe MP, asking the Secretary of State for the Home Office "what plans he has to review the legal status of the hallucinogen Salvia divinorum", Bob Ainsworth, a parliamentary Under-Secretary for the UK Home Office, stated that "The Government are not aware of any evidence of significant misuse of this plant and have no current plans to review its legal status". Following a local newspaper story in October 2005, Bassetlaw MP John Mann raised an Early Day Motion calling for Salvia divinorum to be banned in the UK. (EDM796). The motion only received 11 signatures. A second motion raised in October 2008 attracted 18 signatures. As of 25 May 2016, the Psychoactive Substances Act 2016 makes salvia illegal to possess with intent to supply, possess on custodial premises, supply, import for human consumption, or produce for human consumption. The act was introduced by House of Lords member Michael Bates and MP Theresa May. |
| United States | Laws vary by state | Laws vary by state | Laws vary by state | Laws vary by state | Main article: Legal status of Salvia divinorum in the United States |
| Vietnam | Illegal | Illegal | Illegal | Illegal | Prohibited acts include growing, possessing, selling, transporting, and cultivating salvia divinorum due to its psychoactive effects under the Law on Prevention and Control of Narcotic Substances. |
| Country | Possession | Sale | Transport | Cultivation | Notes |

== See also ==
- Brett's law
- Legal status of ayahuasca by country
- Legal status of ibogaine by country
- Legal status of psilocybin mushrooms
- Legal status of psychoactive Amanita mushrooms
- Legal status of psychoactive cactus by country
