= Legal status of ayahuasca by country =

This is an overview of the legality of ayahuasca by country. Dimethyltryptamine (DMT), one of the active ingredients in ayahuasca, is classified as a Schedule I drug under the United Nations 1971 Convention on Psychotropic Substances, meaning that international trade in DMT is supposed to be closely monitored; use of DMT is supposed to be restricted to scientific research and medical use. Natural materials containing DMT, including ayahuasca, are not regulated under the 1971 Psychotropic Convention. The majority of the world's nations classify DMT as a scheduled drug; however, few countries seem to have laws specifically addressing the possession or use of ayahuasca.

Country	Possession	Sale	Transport	Cultivation	Notes
Australia	Illegal	Illegal	Illegal	Illegal	The Australian Poisons Standard, February 2022, lists dimethyltryptamine (an active ingredient in ayahuasca) as a Schedule 9 substance, making it illegal to sell, import, produce, and possess.
Brazil	Legal	Legal	Legal	Legal	Ayahuasca has been fully legal in Brazil since 1992. Many private companies and nonprofits offer ayahuasca retreats.
Canada	Illegal, unless for religious use	Illegal, unless for religious use	Illegal, unless for religious use	Illegal, unless for religious use	In June 2017 the Santo Daime Church Céu do Montréal received religious exemption to use ayahuasca as a sacrament in their rituals. As of September 2020, a total of six religious organizations have received exemptions to use ayahuasca for religious and spiritual rituals. Medical studies and anecdotal evidence suggest DMT, particularly in the form of ayahuasca, used under proper conditions, may prove helpful for those struggling with addiction, anxiety, depression, and trauma.
Chile	Controlled	Controlled	Controlled	Controlled	There is contradictory evidence regarding the legality of ayahuasca in Chile. Though no specific laws exist to prohibit ayahuasca, DMT is a controlled substance.
Costa Rica	Decriminalized	Illegal	Illegal	Legal	DMT, the psychoactive compound in ayahuasca, is a controlled substance under Costa Rica's Law 8204. Ayahuasca and its plants (Banisteriopsis caapi, Psychotria viridis) are not specifically listed. Personal use and possession are decriminalized, but sale, distribution, transport, or charging for ceremonies fall under trafficking laws and carry 8–15-year prison terms. Cultivation is unregulated unless intended for drug production. The Ministry of Health issued warnings in 2022 and 2025 about unregulated use and promotion.
Denmark	Illegal	Illegal	Illegal	Illegal	Ayahuasca contains the drug DMT, which is on the list of illegal drugs in Denmark, making it illegal to import, produce, and consume. The Santo Daime brought a case forward, claiming their right to consume ayahuasca for religious ceremonies, but the Supreme Court of Denmark rejected the case.
France	Illegal	Illegal	Illegal	Illegal	In France, Santo Daime won a court case allowing them to use the decoction in early 2005; however, they were not allowed an exception for religious purposes, but rather for the simple reason that they did not perform chemical extractions to end up with pure DMT and harmala and the plants used were not scheduled. Four months after the court victory, the common ingredients of ayahuasca as well as harmala were declared stupéfiants, or narcotic scheduled substances, making the Daime and its ingredients illegal to use or possess.
Germany	Illegal	Illegal	Illegal	Illegal	In Germany, the active substances of Ayahuasca, DMT and 5-MeO-DMT, are listed in Annex I of the German Narcotics Law Betäubungsmittelgesetz. Handling the substances without a permit is punishable by law.
Guatemala	Unenforced	Unclear	Unclear	Unclear	Under the Ley Contra la Narcoactividad (1992), "substances or pharmacological agents that, once introduced into the body of a living person, modify their physiological functions and transform their state of consciousness" are illegal; DMT would fall into one of these substances. However, some groups are openly offering retreats.
Ireland	Illegal	Illegal	Illegal	Illegal	An attempt in 2014 by a member of the Santo Daime church to gain a religious exemption to import the drug failed.
Italy	Illegal	Illegal	Illegal	Illegal	Ayahuasca was declared illegal in 2022.
Latvia	Illegal	Illegal	Illegal	Legal	Although plants are not prohibited by law, the dry plant material or any other preparation that contains significant amount of controlled drug (DMT) is considered illegal.
Mexico	Legal	Legal	Legal	Legal	Ayahuasca is fully legal in Mexico, and there are many private companies and nonprofits offering ayahuasca retreats. Despite not being illegal, since March 2022, the Mexican navy has arrested eight people for introducing ayahuasca by air through Mexico City international airport. In July 2022, during a daily press conference, the Secretary of National Defense announced that 161 kilos of ayahuasca had been seized.
Netherlands	Illegal	Illegal	Illegal	Illegal	Ayahuasca is officially illegal in the Netherlands, as of an October 2019 decision by the Supreme Court of the Netherlands. Before this, ayahuasca could be purchased in certain stores in the country, many online sellers of the substance were based in the Netherlands, and it was even possible to book an ayahuasca experience there, but things changed rapidly since the ruling by the Supreme Court. Santo Daime initially won a court case in 2001 which allowed them to continue their ceremonial usage of ayahuasca, but that ruling was also overturned. One factor in this initial decision was a fax from the Secretary of the International Narcotics Control Board to the Netherlands Ministry of Public Health, stating that [P]reparations (e.g. decoctions) made of these plants, including ayahuasca are not under international control and, therefore, not subject to any of the articles of the 1971 Convention.
New Zealand	Illegal	Illegal	Illegal	Illegal	Illegal under the Misuse of Drugs Act 1975 and considered a class A drug.
Norway	Illegal	Illegal	Illegal	Illegal	It is illegal to prepare plants that contain narcotic drugs.
Peru	Legal	Legal	Legal	Legal	Superficial research suggests that ayahuasca is fully legal in Peru and there are many private companies and non-profits offering ayahuasca retreats. Powdered forms of ayahuasca are openly sold in markets, especially in parts of the country within the Amazon basin, such as the city of Iquitos.
Portugal	Decriminalized	Illegal	Illegal	Illegal	In 2001, Portugal decriminalized all previously illegal drugs. This means that though not legal, the possession and use of ayahuasca, just like its active component DMT, is no longer a criminal offense and doesn't carry a jail sentence. The sale, transport, and cultivation of the substance remain criminal offenses, however.
Romania	Illegal	Illegal	Illegal	Illegal	Legal for scientific and medical research studies by authorized doctors in clinics and hospitals only.
Spain	Controlled	Illegal	Controlled	Controlled	Sale to the public is prohibited due to its toxicity. Use and marketing is restricted to the manufacture of pharmaceutical specialities, master formulas, officinal preparations, homeopathic strains and research.
Sweden	Illegal	Illegal	Illegal	Illegal	It is illegal to prepare plants that contain narcotic drugs.
United Kingdom	Ayahuasca vine is legal, but brew: Illegal	Ayahuasca vine is legal, but brew: Illegal	Ayahuasca vine is legal but brew: Illegal	Ayahuasca vine is legal, but DMT-containing plants: Illegal	DMT is a Class A drug and is therefore illegal to distribute or possess. However, since the ayahuasca vine (Banisteriopsis caapi) contains no DMT, and the law does not specifically mention it, it is legal under the Misuse of Drugs Act 1971 and the Psychoactive Substances Act 2016. This being said, the ayahuasca brew, which includes both DMT-containing plants (i.e., Psychotria viridis and Banisteriopsis caapi), remains illegal.
United States	Illegal, unless for religious use	Illegal, unless for religious use	Illegal, unless for religious use	Illegal, unless for religious use	Ayahuasca typically contains DMT, a Schedule I substance, making ayahuasca illegal under federal law. People have been federally prosecuted for ayahuasca possession as recently as 2018. State law also typically outlaws DMT. However, federal courts have granted specific religious groups the right to use ayahuasca for ritual purposes. In Gonzales v. O Centro Espirita Beneficente Uniao do Vegetal, the Supreme Court heard arguments on 1 November 2005, and unanimously ruled in February 2006 that the U.S. federal government must allow the Brazil-based União do Vegetal (UDV) church to import and consume ayahuasca for religious ceremonies under the 1993 Religious Freedom Restoration Act. In September 2008, the three Santo Daime churches filed suit in federal court to gain legal status to import DMT-containing ayahuasca tea. The case, Church of the Holy Light of the Queen v. Mukasey, presided over by Judge Owen M. Panner, was ruled in favor of the Santo Daime church. As of 21 March 2009, a federal judge says members of the church in Ashland can import, distribute and brew ayahuasca. U.S. District Judge Owen Panner issued a permanent injunction barring the government from prohibiting or penalizing the sacramental use of "Daime tea". Panner's order said activities of The Church of the Holy Light of the Queen are legal and protected under freedom of religion. His order prohibits the federal government from interfering with and prosecuting church members who follow a list of regulations set out in his order. Except for ornamental purposes, growing, selling, or possessing Banisteriopsis spp. is prohibited by the Louisiana State Act 159. In June 2019, the city of Oakland, California, in January 2020, the city of Santa Cruz, California, and in September 2020, the city of Ann Arbor, Michigan, decriminalized all "entheogenic" plants, including all natural materials used to produce ayahuasca. In November 2020, more than 76 percent of voters in Washington D.C. voted in favor of the initiative to decriminalize entheogenic plants and fungi. In October 2021, Seattle's city council voted unanimously to decriminalize the cultivation and sharing of psilocybin mushrooms, ayahuasca, ibogaine, and non-peyote-derived mescaline. In November 2021, the city of Detroit made "the personal possession and therapeutic use of entheogenic plants by adults the city's lowest law-enforcement priority."

== See also ==
- Legal status of ibogaine by country
- Legal status of psilocybin mushrooms
- Legal status of psychoactive Amanita mushrooms
- Legal status of psychoactive cactus by country
- Legal status of Salvia divinorum
- Legal status of psychedelic drugs in the United States
- Legal status of psychedelic drugs in the United Kingdom
- Legal status of psychedelic drugs in Canada
