= Legal status of psychedelic drugs in Canada =

The legal status of psychedelic drugs in Canada varies depending on the specific drug in question.

A number of major psychedelics, including DMT, psilocin, psilocybin, mescaline, DOM, 2C-B, 25I-NBOMe, MDA, and LSD among others, are explicitly controlled substances. In addition, most other psychedelic phenethylamines are implicitly banned under catch-all clauses. Conversely, most tryptamines, lysergamides, and scalines are not explicitly nor implicitly banned in Canada as of 2025.

The Controlled Drugs and Substances Act (CDSA) regulates the legality of psychedelic drugs in Canada. Most controlled psychedelics are Schedule III substances under the act, with the exception of amphetamines as a general group which are Schedule I substances.

== Explicitly controlled substances ==
A number of psychedelics and closely related compounds are explicitly controlled substances in Canada as of 2025. These include the following:

- Tryptamines: dimethyltryptamine (DMT) and diethyltryptamine (DET)
  - 4-Hydroxytryptamines: psilocin (4-HO-DMT) and psilocybin (4-PO-DMT)
  - α-Alkyltryptamines: α-ethyltryptamine (AET; etryptamine)
- Phenethylamines:
  - Scalines: mescaline
  - 2Cs: 2C-B
  - 25-NB: 25I-NBOMe, 25C-NBOMe, and 25B-NBOMe
  - Amphetamines:
    - 3C-Scalines: TMA
    - DOx: 2,5-DMA, DOM, DOET, DOB, DOC, TMA-2, and MEM
    - MDxx: MDA, MDOH, MMDA, MDMA, MDEA, MDPR, and MDDM
    - Methoxyamphetamines: PMA (4-MeO-A) and 4-EtO-A
- Lysergamides: LSD
- Arylpiperazines: benzylpiperazine (BZP) and TFMPP

In addition, certain relevant synthetic precursors, including P2P, phenylacetic acid, MDP2P, safrole, isosafrole, piperonal, lysergic acid, ergotamine, and ergometrine, among others, are explicitly controlled substances.

== Implicitly controlled substances ==
In addition to explicitly controlled psychedelics, there are catch-all clauses implicitly banning all amphetamine derivatives and many methoxyphenethylamines in Canada. In the case of methoxyphenethylamines, this blanket ban specifically covers phenethylamines with alkoxy groups in the 2 and 5 and/or 6 positions of the benzene ring and their derivatives, including N-benzylphenethylamines. It also specifically covers certain cyclic ring-extended phenethylamines including benzodioxoles, benzofurans, and benzopyrans. The precise clauses are as follows:

"19. Amphetamines, their salts, derivatives, isomers and analogues and salts of derivatives, isomers and analogues including [...]"

"35. 2C-phenethylamines and their salts, derivatives, isomers and salts of derivatives and isomers that correspond to the following chemical description :"

"any substance that has a 1-amino-2-phenylethane structure substituted at the 2’ and 5’ or 2’ and 6’ positions of the benzene ring by an alkoxy or haloalkoxy group, or substituted at two adjacent carbon atoms of the benzene ring which results in the formation of a furan, dihydrofuran, pyran, dihydropyran or methylenedioxy group — whether or not further substituted on the benzene ring to any extent, whether or not substituted at the amino group by one or two, or a combination of, methyl, ethyl, propyl, isopropyl, hydroxyl, benzyl (or benzyl substituted to any extent) or benzylene (or benzylene substituted to any extent) groups and whether or not substituted at the 2-ethyl (beta carbon) position by a hydroxyl, oxo or alkoxy group — and its salts and derivatives and salts of derivatives, including [...]"

As a result of the preceding clauses, all 2C drugs, DOx drugs, 4C drugs, 3C-scalines, ψ-PEA drugs, BOx drugs, HOT-x drugs, TWEETIOs, MDPEAs, PEA-benzofurans, FLY drugs, and 25-NB drugs, including derivatives, are banned under the rules. In contrast, there are no catch-all clauses or blanket bans in Canada for scalines, tryptamines, lysergamides, arylpiperazines, or other psychedelic chemical groups as of 2025. Similarly, 2Cs with 2 and/or 5 position replacement substitutions, such as 2-OH-2C-B (2-hydroxy-2C-B), 2C-5-TOET (5-thio-2C-E), and 5-DM-25B-NBOMe, are not explicitly nor implicitly controlled in Canada as of 2025. Cyclized phenethylamines (as in side chain and/or amine) may be a more ambiguous case legally.

== Exceptions ==
Although mescaline is explicitly controlled in Canada, there is an exemption if it is in the form of peyote. Conversely, San Pedro cactus is legal only for ornamental purposes. The same is true for dimethyltryptamine (DMT)-containing plants. Psilocybin-containing mushrooms are illegal in Canada. However, many psychedelic mushroom stores have opened in Canada and are operating openly, though raids have occurred. In addition, the sale of psilocybin-containing mushroom spores and grow kits is not illegal and is tolerated in Canada.

There are exceptions for import and use of DMT-containing ayahuasca for several religious groups, including the Santo Daime and União do Vegetal churches among others. Various explicitly controlled psychedelics, including psilocybin, DMT, and LSD among others, are available to physicians for treating patients under Health Canada's Special Access Program (SAP).

A variety of notable psychedelics, including 4-AcO-DMT (psilacetin), 4-HO-MET, 5-MeO-DMT, 5-MeO-DiPT, α-methyltryptamine (AMT), escaline, ergine (LSA), 1P-LSD, ETH-LAD, and LSZ, among many others, are neither explicitly nor implicitly controlled substances in Canada.

== Related drugs ==
While not serotonergic psychedelics, the oneirogens and related drugs harmaline and harmalol are also explicitly controlled substances in Canada. In contrast, other oneirogens including ibogaine, noribogaine, harmine, tetrahydroharmine, and 6-MeO-THH are all not controlled substances. However, Health Canada has added ibogaine to its prescription-drug list, meaning that the drug is regulated in the country.

== See also ==
- Legal status of psychedelic drugs in the United States
- Legal status of psychedelic drugs in the United Kingdom
- Psilocybin decriminalization in the United States
- Timeline of psychedelic legalization and decriminalization
- Legal status of psilocybin mushrooms
- Legal status of ayahuasca by country
- Legal status of psychoactive cacti by country
- Legal status of ibogaine by country
- Online illicit drug vendor
- Psychedelic mushroom store (e.g., FunGuyz)
