= Chidester =

Chidester may be:

- Brett Chidester, American teen-age suicide and “poster-child” for Brett’s law on Salvia divinorum
- Chidester, Arkansas
