= Legal status of psychedelic drugs in the United Kingdom =

This article concerns the legal status of psychedelic drugs in United Kingdom. The legality of psychedelic drugs is regulated in the United Kingdom under bills such as the Misuse of Drugs Act 1971 (including revisions) and the Psychoactive Substances Act 2016.

== Explicitly controlled substances ==
Psychedelics, for instance possession and sale, were initially banned under the United Kingdom's Misuse of Drugs Act 1971. They were made Class A, Schedule 1 controlled substances, the most restrictive classification. The initially banned psychedelics in 1971 included the tryptamines bufotenin, diethyltryptamine (DET), dimethyltryptamine (DMT), and psilocin; the phenethylamines mescaline and DOM; and the lysergamides ergine (lysergamide; lysergic acid amide; LSA), lysergic acid diethylamide (LSD; lysergide), and other N-alkyl derivatives of ergine. A large number of additional psychedelics subsequently became listed and banned in the Misuse of Drugs Act 1971 through revisions over time.

== Implicitly controlled substances ==
In addition to explicitly controlled substances, various generic definitions or "catch-most" clauses were added to the Misuse of Drugs Act 1971 starting in 1977 to implicitly blanket-ban drugs from the tryptamine and phenethylamine families. There is no blanket-ban clause for lysergamides in the Misuse of Drugs Act 1971 aside from N-alkylated derivatives as of 2022, although various individual lysergamides are banned. Many of the psychedelic drugs listed in Alexander Shulgin's books PiHKAL (1991) and TiHKAL (1997) are banned via generic definitions. The United Kingdom was the first country internationally to adopt generic definition legislation, via the Drugs (Prevention of Misuse) Act 1964.

Before 2016, substances had to be added to the Misuse of Drugs Act 1971 in order to make their supply and use illegal, either via single or generic definitions. This was described as tedious and time-consuming. Moreover, it still allowed legal sale and use of many psychoactive designer drugs, also known as novel psychoactive substances (NPS) or "research chemicals", that evaded such definitions. In May 2016, a new law called the Psychoactive Substances Act 2016 was introduced which blanket-banned the production, sale, import, and export of all existing and future psychoactive drugs except certain whitelisted substances like caffeine, alcohol, tobacco or nicotine, food, and prescribed medications. The Psychoactive Substances Act 2016 is aimed mainly at suppliers, and unlike the Misuse of Drugs Act 1971, the bill does not criminalize possession or personal use except under special circumstances such as people with intent to supply or in custodial institutions like prison. There was a considerable decline in designer drugs in the United Kingdom, including psychedelics, following the introduction of the Psychoactive Substances Act 2016.

== Exceptions ==
Psilocybin-containing mushrooms were legal in the United Kingdom for many years due to a legal loophole, but both fresh and dried psilocybin-containing mushrooms were banned in 2005. Psychoactive cacti such as peyote and San Pedro are legal for ornamental purposes and sale in the United Kingdom. However, they are illegal if prepared for consumption or actually consumed. In contrast to the preceding case, ayahuasca is said to be illegal in the United Kingdom due to containing dimethyltryptamine (DMT).

Psychedelics are legal for scientific research under regulated settings in the United Kingdom. Psychedelics that are not controlled under the Misuse of Drugs Act 1971 are exempt from the Psychoactive Substances Act 2016 in the context of basic or clinical research.

== Related drugs ==
Ibogaine was not included in the list of controlled drugs under the Misuse of Drugs Act 1971 and did not become a controlled substance in the United Kingdom until 2016.

== See also ==
- Drug policy of the United Kingdom
- Misuse of Drugs Act 1971 § List of controlled drugs
- Legal status of psychedelic drugs in the United States
- Legal status of psychedelic drugs in Canada
- Legal status of psilocybin mushrooms
- Legal status of ayahuasca by country
- Legal status of psychoactive cacti by country
- Legal status of ibogaine by country
- Timeline of psychedelic legalization and decriminalization
- Online illicit drug vendor
- Psychedelic mushroom store
