= Legal status of psychoactive Amanita mushrooms =

Legal status by country

This is a list of the legality of psychoactive Amanita mushrooms by country. In addition to muscimol and ibotenic acid, some species of Amanita mushrooms, including Amanita citrina and Amanita muscaria, may contain small amounts bufotenin which is illegal in many countries and is not included on this list.

Country	Possession	Sale	Transport	Cultivation	Notes
Australia	Illegal	Illegal	Illegal	Illegal	Amanita muscaria is illegal in Australia as muscimol is a schedule 9 drug.
Sweden	Legal	Legal	Legal	Legal	Amanita muscaria isn't classified as a controlled substance.
Romania	Illegal	Illegal	Illegal	Illegal	
The Netherlands	Illegal	Illegal	Illegal	Illegal	Amanita muscaria and Amanita pantherina have been illegal to buy, sell, or possess since December 2008. Possession of amounts larger than 0.5 g dried or 5 g fresh lead to a criminal charge.
Ireland	Legal	Legal	Legal	Legal	Amanita muscaria was not covered under a regulation introduced in January 2006 under the Misuse of Drugs Acts to outlaw the sale and possession of magic mushrooms containing psilocybin.
Mexico	Legal	Legal	Legal	Legal	Amanita muscaria and Amanita pantherina are not included in the Ley General de Salud. Therefore, its cultivation, possession, buy and sale are considered legal.
Thailand	Legal	Legal	Legal	Legal	The use, storage, transport and sale of Amanita mushrooms is permitted in Thailand.
Ukraine	Legal	Legal	Legal	Legal	Amanita mushrooms are not included in the list of prohibited drugs in Ukraine.
United States Legal in most states with few exceptions mentioned below.	Legal	Legal	Legal	Legal	In Louisiana, except for ornamental purposes, growing, selling or possessing Amanita muscaria is prohibited by Louisiana State Act 159. It is federally prohibited in food or dietary supplements.
Russia	Legal	Legal	Legal	Legal	Amanita mushroom is not included in the list of prohibited substances.
Poland	Legal	Illegal	Legal	Legal	Amanita mushrooms are not included in the list of prohibited substances. However, they are illegal to be sold for human consumption.

== See also ==
- Legal status of ayahuasca by country
- Legal status of ibogaine by country
- Legal status of psilocybin mushrooms
- Legal status of psychoactive cactus by country
- Legal status of Salvia divinorum
