= Tetrapterys styloptera =

Scientific classification
- Kingdom: Plantae
- Clade: Tracheophytes
- Clade: Angiosperms
- Clade: Eudicots
- Clade: Rosids
- Order: Malpighiales
- Family: Malpighiaceae
- Genus: Tetrapterys
- Species: T. styloptera

Binomial name
- Tetrapterys styloptera A.Juss.

Synonyms
- Bunchosia squarrosa Griseb.; Tetrapterys boliviensis Nied.; Tetrapterys boliviensis var. granatensis Nied.; Tetrapterys methystica R.E.Schult.; Tetrapterys reticulata Small; Tetrapterys squarrosa (Griseb.) Griseb.; Tetrapterys tenuistachys Rusby

Species of flowering plant

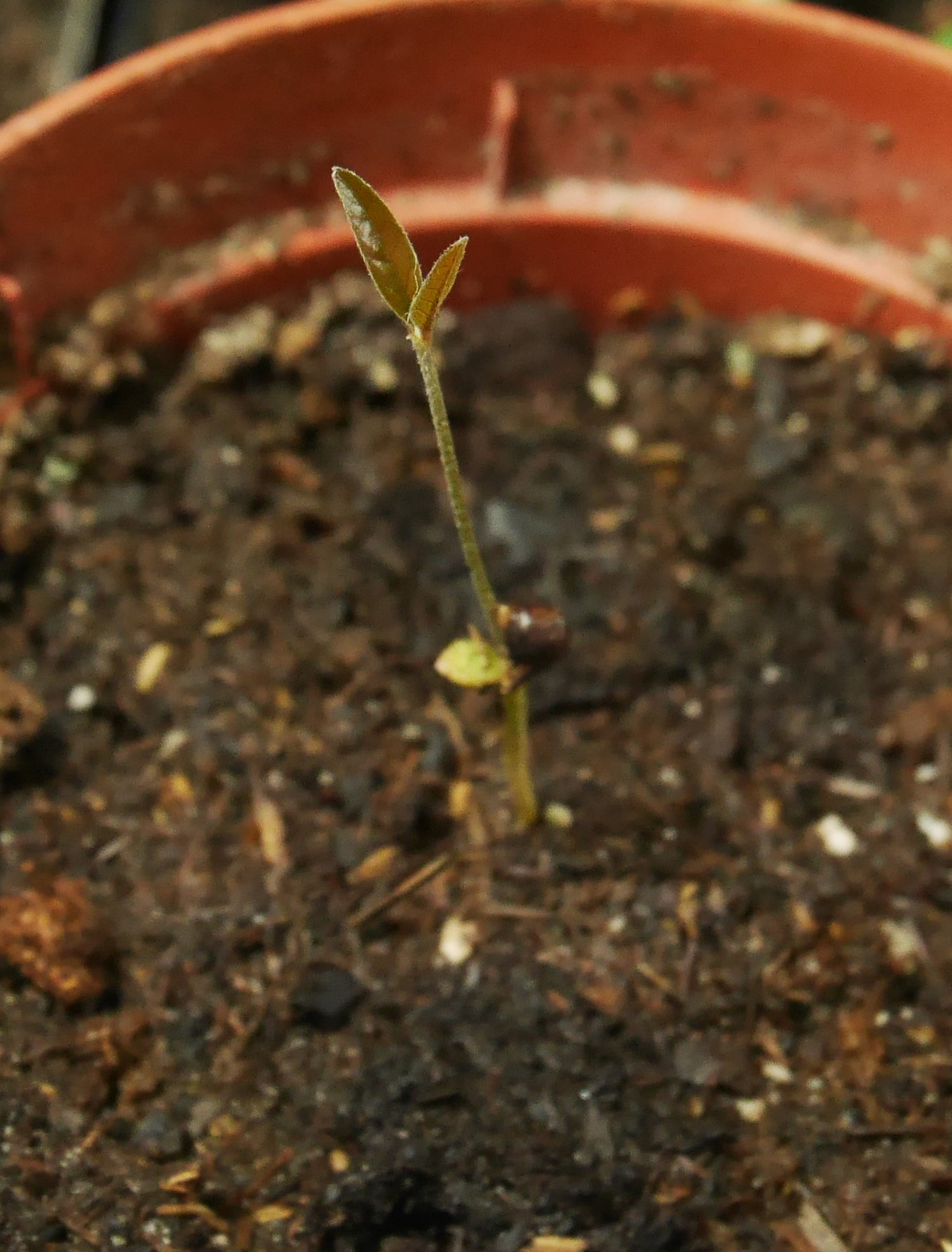
Tetrapterys styloptera seedling

Tetrapterys styloptera (syn. Tetrapterys methystica and Tetrapteris methystica) is a psychoactive plant native to the New World tropics, from Panama to the Amazon rainforest. Despite limited analytic information, its alkaloids are believed to be similar to ones from Banisteriopsis caapi which contains harmala alkaloids and MAOIs. More recently, the vine has been exported from Peru as "grey ayahuasca".

== Legality ==
Tetrapterys methystica is cited in Louisiana State Act 159.
