= Legal status of psilocybin mushrooms =

Legality of activities with psilocybin mushrooms by country Legal Legal for medical use and decriminalized Ambiguous/partially legal/decriminalized Illegal state with decriminalized cities Illegal No information

The legal status of unauthorised actions with psilocybin mushrooms varies worldwide. Psilocybin and psilocin are listed as Schedule I drugs under the United Nations 1971 Convention on Psychotropic Substances. Schedule I drugs are defined as drugs with a high potential for abuse or drugs that have no recognized medical uses. However, psilocybin mushrooms have had numerous medicinal and religious uses in dozens of cultures throughout history and have a significantly lower potential for abuse than other Schedule I drugs.

Psilocybin mushrooms are not regulated by UN treaties. Many countries, however, have some level of regulation or prohibition of psilocybin mushrooms (for example, the US Psychotropic Substances Act, the UK Misuse of Drugs Act 1971, and the Canadian Controlled Drugs and Substances Act).

In some jurisdictions, Psilocybe spores are legal to sell and possess, because they contain neither psilocybin nor psilocin. In other jurisdictions, they are banned because they are items that are used in drug manufacture. A few jurisdictions (such as the US states of California, Georgia, and Idaho) have specifically prohibited the sale and possession of psilocybin mushroom spores. Cultivation of psilocybin mushrooms is considered drug manufacture in most jurisdictions and is often severely penalized, though some countries and one US state (New Mexico) have ruled that growing psilocybin mushrooms does not qualify as "manufacturing" a controlled substance.

== History ==
In the United States, psilocybin (and psilocin) were first subjected to federal regulation by the Drug Abuse Control Amendments of 1965, a product of a bill sponsored by Senator Thomas J. Dodd. The law—passed in July 1965 and effected on 1 February 1966—was an amendment to the federal Food, Drug and Cosmetic Act and was intended to regulate the unlicensed "possession, manufacture, or sale of depressant, stimulant and hallucinogenic drugs". The statutes themselves, however, did not list the "hallucinogenic drugs" that were being regulated. Instead, the term "hallucinogenic drugs" was meant to refer to those substances believed to have a "hallucinogenic effect on the central nervous system".

Despite the seemingly strict provisions of the law, many people were exempt from prosecution. The statutes "permit[ted] ... people to possess such drugs so long as they were for the personal use of the possessor, [for] a member of his household, or for administration to an animal". The Staggers-Dodd bill, enacted 24 October 1968, specifically banned psilocybin and psilocin. The substances were said to have "a high potential for abuse", "no currently accepted medical use", and "a lack of accepted safety". On 27 October 1970, both psilocybin and psilocin became classified as Schedule I drugs and were simultaneously labeled "hallucinogens" under a section of the Comprehensive Drug Abuse Prevention and Control Act known as the Controlled Substances Act. Schedule I drugs are illicit drugs that are claimed to have no known therapeutic benefit. Johns Hopkins researchers suggest that if psilocybin clears the current phase III clinical trials, it should be re-categorized to a schedule IV drug such as prescription sleep aids, but with tighter control.

The United Nations Convention on Psychotropic Substances (adopted in 1971) requires its members to prohibit psilocybin, and parties to the treaty are required to restrict use of the drug to medical and scientific research under strictly controlled conditions. However, the mushrooms containing the drug were not specifically included in the convention, due largely to pressure from the Mexican government. Most national drug laws have been amended to reflect the terms of the convention; examples include the UK Misuse of Drugs Act 1971, the US Psychotropic Substances Act of 1978, Australia Poisons Standard (October 2015), the Canadian Controlled Drugs and Substances Act of 1996, and the Japanese Narcotics and Psychotropics Control Law of 2002. The possession and use of psilocybin is prohibited under almost all circumstances, and often carries severe legal penalties.

== Complexities of enforcement ==
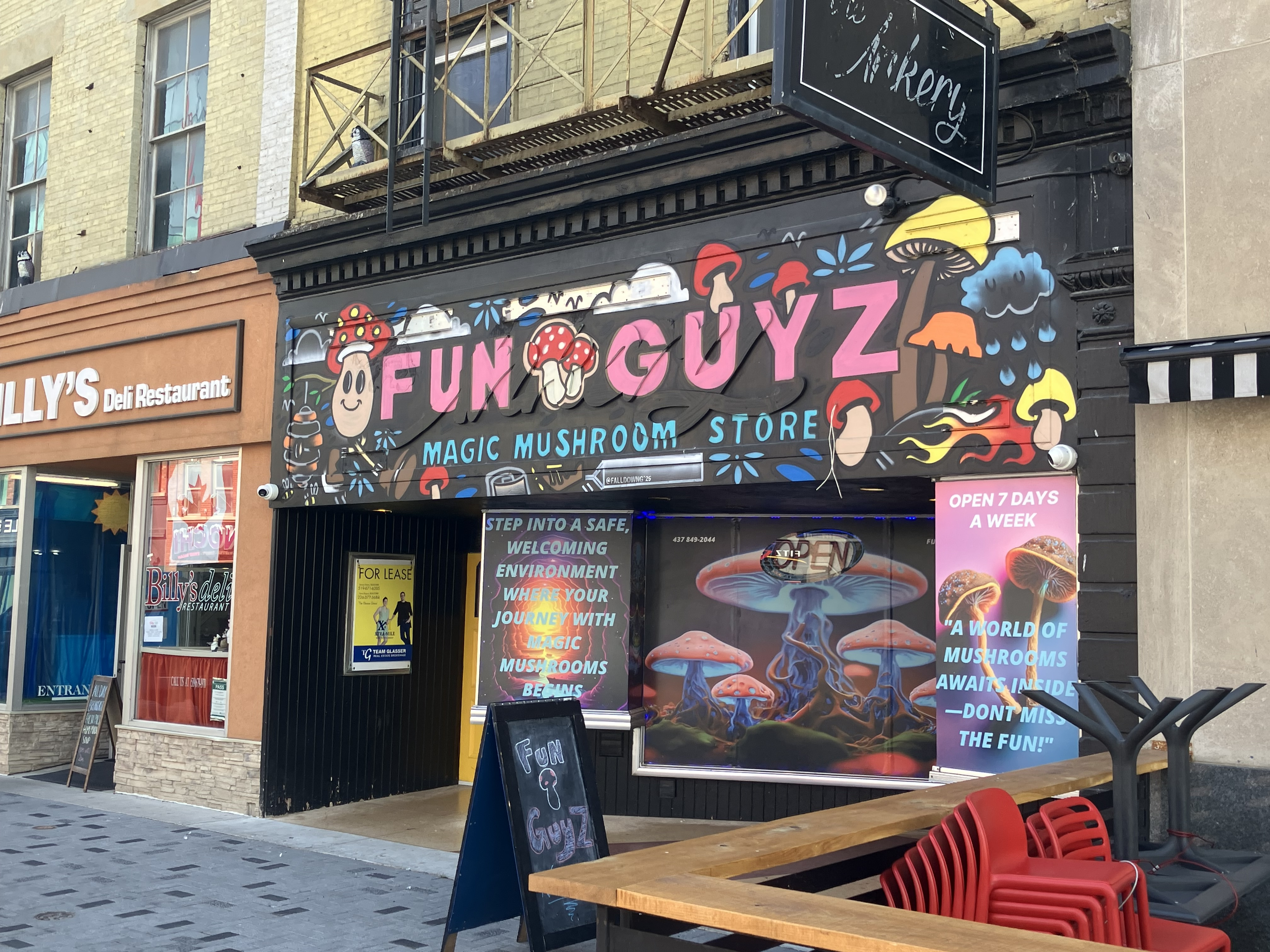
Despite it being illegal to sell psilocybin containing mushrooms under the Controlled Drugs and Substances Act, some dispensaries in Canada operate openly

Possession and use of psilocybin mushrooms, including the bluing species of Psilocybe, is therefore prohibited by extension. However, in many national, state, and provincial drug laws, there has been a great deal of ambiguity about the legal status of psilocybin mushrooms, as well as a strong element of selective enforcement in some places. Most US state courts have considered the mushroom a "container" of the illicit drugs, and therefore illegal. A loophole further complicates the legal situation—the spores of psilocybin mushrooms do not contain the drugs, and are legal to possess in many areas. Jurisdictions that have specifically enacted or amended laws to criminalize the possession of psilocybin mushroom spores include Germany (since 1998), and California, Georgia, and Idaho in the United States. As a consequence, there is an active underground economy involved in the sale of spores and cultivation materials, and an internet-based social network to support the illicit activity.

== Changes in the 2020s ==
On 3 November 2020, voters passed a ballot initiative in Oregon that made "magic mushrooms" legal for mental health treatment in supervised settings from 1 February 2021.

In November 2020, the District of Columbia passed initiative 81; the short title of the initiative was the Entheogenic Plant and Fungus Policy Act of 2020 and it came into effect on March 15, 2021. This bill allows for the possession and non-for-profit gifting or distribution of psilocybin mushrooms, ibogaine, dimethyltryptamine (nn-DMT), and mescaline by similar measures as to the already in place bills for the possession and gifting of marijuana products.

On 5 October 2022, the Canadian province of Alberta announced it would be among the first to regulate and allow the use of psilocybin, LSD, MDMA, mescaline, ketamine, and DMT for medicinal purposes in drug-assisted psychotherapy. The new regulations came into effect in January 2023. In 2022, Colorado became the second US state to decriminalize psilocybin mushrooms.

On 5 February 2023, Australia approved psilocybin and MDMA in prescription medications for the treatment of PTSD and treatment resistant depression. This went into effect on 1 July 2023.

== List by country ==
Country	Possession	Sale	Transport	Cultivation	Notes
Australia	Psilocybin is legal for medical treatment.	Illegal	Illegal	Illegal but spores or magic kits are not illegal since they don't contain psilocybin	Cultivation, manufacture, possession, use and supply of psilocybin is illegal throughout Australia. From July 2023, authorised psychiatrists can prescribe psilocybin for treatment-resistant depression.
Austria	Legal	Illegal	Legal	Legal (No restriction for cultivation as long as the mushrooms are not intended to be used as drugs)	The personal possession and use of psilocybin mushrooms is not criminalized. Cultivation is technically legal as long as the mushrooms are not harvested for use. Selling or offering or providing access to the mushrooms to others is illegal.
Bahamas	Legal	Illegal	Legal	Legal for private use	Magic Mushrooms are fully legal in the Bahamas, however psilocybin and psilocin are controlled substances by the United Nations Convention on Narcotic Drugs.
Belgium	Illegal	Illegal	Illegal	Illegal, but uncontrolled	In Belgium, cultivation of mushrooms has been prohibited since the enactment of the Criminal Law of 25 February 1921. Possession and sale of mushrooms have been prohibited since the Royal Decree of 22 January 1998.
Belize	Illegal	Illegal	Illegal	Illegal, mushroom spores are unenforced when a psychonaut grows or cultivates in their home	In Belize, psilocin is listed in the Misuse of Drugs Act and penalty of "5 years, $100,000, or both."
Bolivia	Illegal	Illegal	Illegal	Illegal	In Bolivia, psilocybin and psilocin are banned substances.
Bulgaria	Illegal	Illegal	Illegal	Illegal	In Bulgaria, psilocybin and psilocin are banned substances. They are listed in "List I" which includes all plants and substances with a high degree of risk to public health due to the harmful effect of abuse. They are prohibited for use in humane and veterinary medicine.
Brazil	Legal	Legal	Legal	Legal	Only psilocybin and psilocin are listed illegal, but not the fungal species themselves. The Federal Constitution states that an act must be previously stated as illegal by a law. Therefore, psilocybin mushrooms cannot be considered illegal themselves. There are also no legal jurisprudences available on the topic, neither records of people being arrested specifically for using, growing or possessing psilocybin mushrooms in the country. They are sold mainly over the internet on specialized websites, without facing persecution from Brazilian police.
British Virgin Islands	Legal	Illegal (unenforced)	Illegal (unenforced)	Legal	Where mushrooms grow naturally, it is legal to possess and consume psilocybin mushrooms; however, their sale is illegal. Despite this, many businesses openly sell them.
Cambodia	Illegal (unenforced)	Illegal (unenforced)	Illegal (unenforced)	Illegal (unenforced)	In Cambodia, psilocybin mushrooms are prohibited, but in many parts of the country, especially touristic ones, they are mostly ignored by legal authorities, as it happens with other illegal drugs.
Canada	Illegal (unenforced)	Illegal (unenforced), legal medically	Illegal (unenforced)	Illegal (unenforced)	Mushroom spore kits are legal and are sold openly in stores or on the internet as the spores and kits themselves are legal as they do not contain psilocybin/psilocin. Psilocybin and psilocin are illegal to possess, obtain or produce without an exemption or license as they are schedule III under the Controlled Drugs and Substances Act. Online dispensaries exist that illegally sell microdoses. In September 2019, a motion to increase enforcement efforts against the sale of magic mushrooms was voted down by Vancouver council. Efforts are underway to obtain exemptions for medical and research use under CDSA Section 56. In 2020, eleven end-of-life patients, including possibly also a first non-palliative patient, received an exemption to pursue psilocybin-assisted psychotherapy to help ease anxiety and depression. In 2020, 16 health professionals received permission from the Ministry of Health to use psilocybin themselves to help develop therapies for future use. In 2021, exemptions have been granted to use psilocybin therapy as a treatment for mental health conditions. Canada health regulators announced that the government would allow physicians to request access to psychedelics on behalf of patients with serious or life-threatening medical conditions. This exempted the patients from being prosecuted by law enforcement. On 5 October 2022, the Province of Alberta announced it would effectively make all psychedelics, including Psilocybin mushrooms, legal and regulated for medicinal use from January 2023.
Chile	Illegal, but tolerated and decriminalized for small amounts	Illegal	Illegal	Illegal (Grow kits, spores, and mycelium legal)	Psilocybin and psilocin are listed as narcotic drugs on Ley Nº 20.000. There have been some recent reports of imprisonment for sale and possession of magic mushrooms in Chile, as well as indications that their usage is getting more popular in the country. However, Psilocybe spores and kits are completely legal and openly sold on specialized Chilean websites.
Croatia	Illegal (decriminalized)	Illegal	Illegal	Illegal (unenforced)	From 2013, the possession of a small amount of light drugs is a misdemeanor, which can lead to a fine of 5,000–20,000kn ($800–3,500) depending on the case in question.
Cyprus	Illegal (decriminalized)	Illegal	Illegal	Illegal not enforced (decriminalized)	Magic mushrooms are very rare in Cyprus. Although possession and consumption are both illegal, an individual who was found to have ordered psilocybin mushrooms over the internet was fined 1500 Euros and was not given time in prison.
Czech Republic	Illegal (decriminalized); Medical use has been legal in the Czech Republic since 1 January 2026.	Illegal	Illegal	Illegal (decriminalized) Spores are not illegal since they don't contain psilocybin	Spores are legal to buy, sell and possess. Possession of drugs for personal use and cultivation of plants and mushrooms containing a narcotic or psychotropic substance "in a small quantity" are excluded from criminal prosecution. These violations of law are punished by administrative law as a misdemeanour (Act No. 200/1990 Coll., Act of Violations). Medical use of psilocybin has been legal in the Czech Republic since 1 January 2026. This applies in "psilocybin-assisted therapy in psychiatric hospitals and clinics, where qualified psychiatrists and therapists would administer the treatment under strict supervision".
Denmark	Illegal	Illegal	Illegal	Illegal	The sale and possession of psilocybin have long been illegal; however the growing/collecting, processing, sale, and possession of psilocybin mushrooms was legal until 1 July 2001, when the Danish Ministry of Health prohibited them.
Estonia	Illegal	Illegal	Illegal	Illegal	Both psilocybin and mushrooms are explicitly banned in Estonia according to Narcotic Drugs and Psychotropic Substances Act.
Finland	Illegal	Illegal	Illegal	Illegal	As of 1 September 2008, the new 1st section of the 50th chapter of the penal code specially prohibits (attempt of) growing Psilocybe mushrooms.
France	Illegal	Illegal	Illegal	Illegal, but spores are always legal	In France, psilocybin mushrooms have been listed as a narcotic since 1 June 1966; thus, possession, use, transportation and collection are subject to criminal sanctions.
Germany	Illegal	Illegal	Illegal	Illegal, but spores are legal for microscopy.	Illegal if for the purpose of intoxication. Germany allows two facilities to offer psilocybin to adults with treatment-resistant depression, through an established compassionate use program prior to regulatory approval.
Greece	Illegal unless treated as psilocin	Illegal unless treated as psilocin	Illegal	Legal for private human consumption but not for sale, can be treated as psilocin as psilocybin could be legal or lawful	Cultivation is prohibited. For sale and possession, hallucinogenic mushrooms may be treated as psilocin.
Hong Kong	Illegal	Illegal	Illegal	Illegal	Cultivation is prohibited, and sale and possession is illegal.
Hungary	Illegal	Illegal	Illegal	Illegal	In Hungary, mushrooms are specifically illegal under Art. 282 of the Penal Code, as they are treated as psilocin.
Iceland	Illegal	Illegal	Illegal	Illegal	According to article 6 of the Illegal substance act, Psilocybin, DMT, Mescaline, LSD and Cannabis among other psychedelics are completely illegal in Iceland regardless of purpose.
India	Illegal (unenforced)	Illegal (unenforced)	Illegal (unenforced)	Illegal (unenforced)	Psilocybin mushrooms are officially illegal in India, but their prohibition is poorly enforced due to a lack of awareness among authorities. While there have been arrests on record, they are infrequent, and many areas in India are considered unofficial "psychedelic tourism" destinations. In 2025, the high court in Kerala, India, has declared that magic mushrooms are not "narcotics or psychotropic substances."
Indonesia	Illegal (unenforced)	Illegal (unenforced)	Illegal (unenforced)	Illegal (unenforced)	Psilocybin mushrooms are illegal, classified as illegal drug type 1 with capital punishment. But currently law enforcements have been done more frequently Psilocybin mushrooms are advertised openly by cafes in Bali and the Gili Islands.
Ireland	Illegal	Illegal	Illegal	Illegal (unenforced)	Until 31 January 2006, unprepared psilocybin mushrooms were legal in Republic of Ireland. On that date they were made illegal by a ministerial order . This decision was partly based on the death of Dubliner Colm Hodkinson, age 33, who jumped to his death from a balcony on 30 October 2005, after consuming legally purchased psilocybin mushrooms along with alcohol and marijuana.
Israel	Illegal (Illegal for personal consumption)	Illegal (Illegal for personal consumption)	Illegal (Illegal for personal consumption)	Illegal (Illegal for personal consumption)	According to Israeli drug laws, psilocybin and psilocin are illegal, but psilocybin-containing mushrooms are legal for possession, cultivation and sale as long as they are not used for the purpose of personal use. There have been records of people being arrested for growing and selling large quantities of magic mushrooms for recreational purposes in the country.
Italy	Illegal (decriminalized)	Illegal (decriminalized)	Illegal (decriminalized)	Illegal (decriminalized)	Spores are legal to buy, sell and possess. Grow kits are illegal.
Jamaica	Legal	Legal	Legal	Legal for private use	Psilocybin mushrooms have never been made illegal and are openly sold. Jamaican company Cosmic Mushrooms touts itself as the first cultivator of magic mushrooms.
Japan	Illegal	Illegal	Illegal	Illegal (Spores are legal)	Prior to 2002, psilocybin mushrooms were widely available in Japan and were often sold in mail-order shops, online vendors and in head shops throughout Japan; according to Hideo Eno of Japan's Health Ministry narcotics division, prior to 2002, "You can find them [psilocybin mushrooms] anywhere." In June 2002, Japan Health, Labor and Welfare Ministry added psilocybin mushrooms to Schedule Narcotics of Narcotic and Psychotropic Drug Control Law, possibly in preparation for the World Cup, and in response to a widely reported case of mushroom poisoning. Use, production, trafficking, growing or possession of psilocybin mushrooms is now illegal in Japan. Metropolitan Police Officer says that spores are legal where it does not contain psilocybin.
Laos	Illegal (unenforced)	Illegal (unenforced)	Illegal (unenforced)	Illegal (unenforced)	Psilocybin mushrooms are illegal, but openly sold in businesses, specifically in Vang Vieng.
Latvia	Illegal	Illegal	Illegal	Illegal	Growing Psilocybin mushrooms is illegal in Latvia under S. 256 of the Penal Code, in case of a repeated offence. Both possession and sale of them are considered as a narcotic substance.
Lithuania	Illegal	Illegal	Illegal	Illegal	In Lithuania, growing is prohibited under Art. 265 of the Penal Code, possession and sale are illegal under Administrative and Penal codes.
Luxembourg	Illegal	Illegal	Illegal	Illegal	In Luxembourg, mushrooms are considered sources of psilocybin and psilocin and hence subject to legal persecution.
Mexico	Illegal (unenforced if in native culture)	Illegal	Illegal	Illegal (Grow kits, spores, and mycelium legal, unenforced when is grown in the nature and in the outdoor in the wild.)	Psilocin and psilocybin are prohibited under the Ley General de Salud of 1984, which also specifically mentions psilocybin-containing fungi as being covered by the law, and mentions Psilocybe mexicana and Psilocybe cubensis in particular. However, these laws are rarely, if ever, enforced against indigenous users of psychoactive fungi. The Mexican government has also specifically taken the position that wild occurrence of Psilocybe does not constitute drug production. Mushroom spores and grow kits in Mexico are legal and are sold openly on the Internet. Various political parties proposed to reclassify psilocybin mushrooms, enabling scientific research.
Moldova	Illegal	Illegal	Illegal	Illegal	Psilocin/psilotsin and Psilocibin are present in the official list of prohibited substances.
Nepal	Legal	Legal	Legal	Legal	Magic Mushrooms are uncontrolled substances in the Everest Mountain country
Netherlands	Legal as truffle	Legal as truffle	Legal as truffle	Legal as truffles (Active cultures of mycelium and spores legal)	Since December 2008, possession of both dry and fresh psychoactive mushrooms has been forbidden by law. The Openbaar Ministerie – the Dutch prosecutor's office – stated that prosecution shall be started on possession of 0.5g dried or 5g fresh psychoactive mushrooms. Possession of these minor amounts is allowed and will not lead to a criminal charge. Before December 2008, unprocessed psychoactive mushrooms were not covered under the opium law, making them legal to possess, consume and sell, and could be bought in "smart shops" which specialize in ethnobotanicals. Although a legal loophole not outlawing psychoactive mushroom species as truffles has led to the widespread sale of these "Magic Truffles" in smart shops across the nation. Since September 2019, magic truffles are fully taxed and legalized.
New Zealand	Illegal	Illegal	Illegal	Illegal	In New Zealand, psilocybin and psilocin are class A drugs, putting them in the highest class of illicit compounds along with heroin and LSD. The 'Misuse of drugs act 1975' lists 'Conocybe, Panaeolus, or Psilocybe' species specifically.
Norway	Illegal	Illegal	Illegal	Illegal	In Norway, magic mushrooms are specifically outlawed according to explicit regulation regarding narcotics.
Philippines	legal (ambiguous)	Illegal (ambiguous)	Illegal (ambiguous)	legal (ambiguous)	The legal status of the Psilocybin mushrooms as a drug came into light when high school students were reportedly hospitalized after consuming the mushrooms for their psychedelic property in 2019. Psilocybin mushrooms themselves are not in the "list of drugs included in schedule" under the Comprehensive Dangerous Drugs Act of 2002 and therefore the Philippine Drug Enforcement Agency (PDEA) can't arrest the students and only issue an advisory against the use of the mushrooms at best. The Philippines is a signatory of the United Nations Convention on Narcotic Drugs which lists psilocybin as a Schedule I substance. However, the PDEA has conducted arrests of illegal drug peddlers who also sold psilocybin mushrooms alongside other illegal substances in the past.
Poland	Illegal (Illegal when containing psilocybin/psilocin. Legal when contains muscimol, ibotenic acid, muscarin or any other psychoactive or psychotropic substance that isn't psilocybin or psilocin)	Illegal (Illegal when containing psilocybin/psilocin. Legal when contains muscimol, ibotenic acid, muscarin or any other psychoactive or psychotropic substance that isn't psilocybin or psilocin)	Illegal (Illegal when containing psilocybin/psilocin. Legal when contains muscimol, ibotenic acid, muscarin or any other psychoactive or psychotropic substance that isn't psilocybin or psilocin)	Illegal providing mushrooms contain psilocybin or psilocin. Grow kits, spores, and mycelium therefore legal.	Psilocybin and psilocin are listed illegal, but not the fungal species themselves. Mushroom spore kits and grow kits are legal and are sold openly in stores.
Portugal	Illegal (decriminalized)	Illegal (decriminalized)	Illegal (decriminalized)	Illegal (decriminalized)	The Drug policy of Portugal has decriminalized possession of all drugs.
Romania	Illegal	Illegal	Illegal	Illegal	Psilocybin in any form is illegal.
Russia	Illegal	Illegal	Illegal	Illegal, but spores are always legal	Psilocybin in any form is illegal.
Samoa	Illegal	Illegal	Illegal	Illegal	According to the Samoan 1967 Narcotics Act possession of Psilocybin containing mushrooms is illegal plus psilocybin and psilocin are classified as Class A narcotics.
Serbia	Illegal	Illegal	Illegal	Illegal	Psilocybin in any form is illegal.
Slovakia	Illegal (ambiguous)	Illegal (ambiguous)	Illegal (ambiguous)	Illegal (ambiguous)	There is little legal experience in Slovakia on the legal evaluation of magic mushrooms, making their legality somewhat ambiguous. Low quantities could possibly be treated as psilocin in the country, but large quantities may be considered as a "preparation" of a drug trafficking offence, which has the same sentence as an offence actually committed.
Slovenia	Illegal (decriminalized)	Illegal	Illegal	Legal (No restriction for cultivation as long as the mushrooms are not intended to be used as drugs)	In Slovenia, all drugs are decriminalised for personal use.
South Africa	Illegal	Illegal	Illegal	Legal (Grow kits and spores are legal)	Psilocin (4-hydroxydimethyltryptamine) and Psilocybin (4-phosphoryloxy-N,N-dimethyltryptamine) are listed as Undesirable Dependence-Producing Substances. Spores - which do not contain Psilocin or Psilocybin - may be legal to purchase, own or sell.
Spain	Illegal (Decriminalized for personal use in a private place)	Illegal	Illegal	Illegal (Decriminalized for personal use in a private place)	Psilocybin mushrooms are noted to be illegal to sell, and its possession and cultivation legal when treated as mushrooms. Possession, production and distribution of psilocybin is illegal, but its consumption in private places is decriminalized. This makes the legality of psilocybin mushrooms, grow kits and spores ambiguous and usually it is based on the intent of use and the judge's interpretation of the law.
Sri Lanka	Illegal	Illegal	Illegal	Legal for public interests and research or experiments	Although their presence and usage are extremely rare in the country, psilocybin mushrooms are also banned in Sri Lanka. In 2016, a local woman was arrested and became famous for illegally importing magic mushrooms from the United States, worth about Rs 250,000, and trafficking them for a select group of people.
Sweden	Illegal	Illegal	Illegal	Spores (and grow kits) are legal, it is legal to grow mycelium but not fruit bodies.	Schedule 1: Psilocybin mushrooms.; Schedule 1: Psilocybe cubensis.; Schedule 1: Psilocybe semilanceata.
Switzerland	Illegal, but decriminalized possession is punishable with a spot fine	Illegal	Illegal	Illegal	Although psilocybin and psilocin have long been listed as controlled substances in Switzerland, mushrooms themselves were only specifically banned in 2002, initially by the Swiss Agency for Therapeutic Products and later, by a revision of the Swiss Narcotics Act in 2008. Until 2002, magic mushrooms were readily available in Switzerland and, according to a Swiss medical agency, their ban was an attempt to prevent their increasing popularity in the country. However, some local health and legal authorities have criticized magic mushroom's prohibition, since surveys have shown that it had little impact on decreasing their consumption in the country.
Taiwan	Illegal	Illegal	Illegal	Illegal	In Taiwan, psilocybin mushrooms are illegal. They are considered a Category 2 drug, alongside marijuana and amphetamine.
Thailand	Illegal (unenforced)	Illegal (unenforced)	Illegal (unenforced)	Illegal (unenforced)	Psilocybin mushrooms are illegal, but are commonly sold openly in businesses. The Thai government plans to grow psilocybin-containing mushrooms for the purposes of researching their potential therapeutic effects. If the studies are successful, psilocybin-containing mushrooms could be removed from the country's 'Category 5' narcotics list.
Turkey	Illegal	Illegal	Illegal	Illegal (Spores are legal for microscopy)	In Turkey magic mushrooms are treated as psilocybin which is illegal. The sale, growth and possession can lead to prosecution.
Ukraine	Illegal	Illegal	Illegal	Illegal (Spores are legal)	Psilocybin in any form is illegal. According to the Ukrainian Criminal Code, fetal bodies of fungi containing psilocybin are considered a psychotropic substance, and the dose, which entails criminal liability, is 0.01 g of psilocybin, is about 30-40 g of fresh mushrooms. However, the legislation does not prohibit the sale of mushroom spores for cultivation for the purpose of collecting.
United Kingdom	Illegal	Illegal	Illegal	Illegal (Spores are legal for microscopy)	From 18 July 2005 both fresh and "prepared" (that is, dried, cooked or made into a tea) psilocybin mushrooms became illegal in the United Kingdom; fresh mushrooms had previously been widely available, even in shops, but section 21 of the Drugs Act 2005 made fresh psychedelic mushrooms ("fungi containing psilocybin"), a Class A drug. Possession and use of psilocybin and psilocin is prohibited since the 2005 Act, but mushroom spores, which do not contain psilocybin, are not regulated. Grow kits can be bought legally through specialised websites because they do not contain psilocybin and psilocin.
United States	Illegal (Decriminalized in Seattle, Washington; Ann Arbor, Michigan; Berkeley, Oakland, Santa Cruz, San Francisco, California; Somerville and Cambridge, Massachusetts; Oregon; and Washington D.C.) (Legal in Colorado)	Illegal (Sales between permitted medical entities might be allowed in certain cities and states where it is decriminalized.)	Illegal (Decriminalized in Seattle, Washington; Ann Arbor, Michigan; Oakland and Santa Cruz, California; Somerville and Cambridge, Massachusetts; Oregon; and Washington D.C.) (Legal in Colorado)	Illegal (Spores are legal in most states, full cultivation decriminalized in Seattle, Washington; Ann Arbor, Michigan; Oakland and Santa Cruz, California; Somerville and Cambridge, Massachusetts; Oregon; and Washington D.C.) (Legal in Colorado)	See also: Psilocybin decriminalization in the United States In the United States, possession of psilocybin-containing mushrooms is illegal because they contain the Schedule I drugs psilocin and psilocybin. Spores, which do not contain psychoactive chemicals, are explicitly illegal in Georgia, Idaho, and California (unlisted states unverified). In the rest of the country, it is not illegal to just sell the spores, but selling them with the purpose of producing hallucinogenic mushrooms is illegal. Except for ornamental purposes, growing, selling or possessing Psilocybe spp. and Conocybe spp. is prohibited by Louisiana State Act 159. The cities of Denver, Colorado, Oakland, California, Santa Cruz, California, and Ann Arbor, Michigan have decriminalized the drug. On 3 November 2020 during 2020 US presidential election, the state of Oregon voted in an initiative to legalize psilocybin for mental health treatment at licensed centers and to decriminalize the possession of small amounts of all drugs. The new law came into effect on 1 February 2021. On the same day Washington, D.C. passed an initiative to decriminalize the cultivation and possession of "entheogenic plants and fungi". In 2021, the City Councils of Somerville, Northampton, Cambridge, Massachusetts, and Seattle, Washington, voted for decriminalization. California introduced Senate Bill 58 in 2023 which would have decriminalized many psychedelics including psilocybin, but it was vetoed by Governor Newsom citing the need for 1) treatment and dosing guidelines, 2) rules to protect patients from being exploited during treatment, and 3) ways to make sure they have no underlying psychoses. On 7 September 2022, San Francisco lawmakers had unanimously approved a measure calling for the decriminalization of the use of entheogenic plants. On 8 November 2022, Colorado voters passed Proposition 122, the Natural Medicine Health Act, decriminalizing psilocybin (including psilocybin mushrooms), psilocin, dimethyltryptamine (also known as DMT), ibogaine, and mescaline, for those aged 21 and over. This also legalized licensed "healing centers" where patients can experience psilocybin under supervision (which may also be expanded to include DMT, ibogaine, and mescaline), also only for those aged 21 and over. The initiative also allows those 21 and older to grow, possess and share the psychedelic substances but not sell them for personal use, effective immediately. The regulated natural medicine access program or "healing centers" will be established no later than the end of 2024.
Uruguay	Decriminalized	Illegal	Illegal	Illegal	In Uruguay, psilocybin and psilocin are mentioned in the federal list of controlled substances; Uruguay was first country in South America to decriminalize possession of all and every drug. According to Decreto N° 403/016, all fungal species of the Psilocybe sp. genus are illegal to sell as a medicinal compound, and other psilocybin-containing fungi genera, such as Copelandia, Pluteus and Conocybe are also mentioned in the document.
Vietnam	Illegal (unenforced)	Illegal (unenforced), Magic mushrooms are sold and supplied openly	Illegal (unenforced)	Illegal (unenforced) Legal for medical or scientific research	In Vietnam, psilocybin and psilocin were added to the list of banned substances in 2018 through Decree 73. Magic mushrooms for ornamental uses made by people or scientific research made by physicians or psychonauts isn't fully legal in Vietnam.

== See also ==
- Psilocybin decriminalization in the United States
- Legal status of psychoactive Amanita mushrooms
- Legal status of ayahuasca by country
- Legal status of ibogaine by country
- Legal status of psychoactive cactus by country
- Legal status of Salvia divinorum
- Legal status of psychedelic drugs in the United States
- Legal status of psychedelic drugs in the United Kingdom
- Legal status of psychedelic drugs in Canada
- Timeline of psychedelic legalization and decriminalization
- Psilocybin therapy
- Psychedelic mushroom store
