= Intoxicating Substances (Supply) Act 1985 =

Act of the Parliament of the United Kingdom

Intoxicating Substances (Supply) Act 1985 (Note: Section 3(1).)
- Act of Parliament
- Parliament of the United Kingdom
- Long title: An Act to prohibit the supply to persons under the age of eighteen of certain substances which may cause intoxication if inhaled.
- Citation: 1985 c. 26
- Territorial extent: England and Wales; Northern Ireland; (Note: Section 3(3).)

Dates
- Royal assent: 13 June 1985
- Commencement: 13 August 1985 (Note: Section 3(2).)
- Repealed: 26 May 2016 (Note: The Psychoactive Substances Act 2016 (Commencement) Regulations 2016 (SI 2016/553).)
Other legislation
Amended by	Statute Law (Repeals) Act 1993
Repealed by	Psychoactive Substances Act 2016

Status: Repealed

Text of statute as originally enacted

Revised text of statute as amended

The Intoxicating Substances (Supply) Act 1985 (c. 26) was an act of the Parliament of the United Kingdom. It made it an offence for people to supply substances that are not controlled by the Misuse of Drugs Act 1971 to people under 18 years of age when it is likely that the substance could be inhaled for the purpose of intoxication. The legislation was drafted in the 1980s due to concern over solvent abuse but was used in the 2010s to prosecute those selling designer drugs that are inhaled. The act was repealed and replaced by the Psychoactive Substances Act 2016.
