= Legal status of psychedelic drugs in the United States =

The legal status of psychedelic drugs in United States varies depending on the specific drug and jurisdiction in question.

Various major psychedelics, including DMT, psilocin, psilocybin, 5-MeO-DMT, mescaline, DOM, 2C-B, 25I-NBOMe, MDA, and LSD among others, are explicitly controlled substances. In addition, if intended for human consumption and "substantially similar", many psychedelics that are analogues of scheduled psychedelics may themselves also be considered controlled substances.

The Controlled Substances Act (CSA) and U.S. Drug Enforcement Administration (DEA) regulate the legality of psychedelic drugs in the United States. Almost all controlled psychedelic drugs in the country are Schedule I controlled substances as of 2026, with a few exceptions.

== List of controlled psychedelics ==
Psychedelic drugs and closely related compounds that are explicitly controlled substances in the United States at the federal level as of 2026 include:

- Tryptamines: dimethyltryptamine (DMT) and diethyltryptamine (DET)
  - 4-Hydroxytryptamines: psilocin (4-HO-DMT) and psilocybin (4-PO-DMT) (both found in psilocybin-containing mushrooms)
  - 5-Hydroxytryptamines: bufotenin (5-HO-DMT)
  - 5-Methoxytryptamines: 5-MeO-DMT and 5-MeO-DiPT
  - α-Alkyltryptamines: α-methyltryptamine (AMT) and α-ethyltryptamine (AET; etryptamine)
- Phenethylamines:
  - Scalines: mescaline (found in peyote)
  - 2Cs: 2C-B, 2C-C, 2C-D, 2C-E, 2C-H, 2C-I, 2C-N, 2C-P, 2C-T-2, 2C-T-4, and 2C-T-7
  - 25-NB: 25I-NBOMe, 25C-NBOMe, and 25B-NBOMe
  - Amphetamines:
    - 3C-Scalines: TMA (3,4,5-TMA)
    - DOx: 2,5-DMA, DOM, DOET, DOB
    - MDxx: MDA, MDOH (N-hydroxy-MDA), MMDA, MDMA, MDEA
    - Methoxyamphetamines: PMA and PMMA
  - Cyclized phenethylamines:
    - 3-Benzazepines: lorcaserin
- Lysergamides: ergine (LSA) and LSD
- Arylpiperazines: benzylpiperazine (BZP)

The arylpiperazine TFMPP was temporarily scheduled in 2002, but this expired in 2004 and was not renewed. The amphetamine fenfluramine was also previously a controlled substance, but was unscheduled in 2022.

Certain synthetic precursors, including phenylacetone (P2P) and lysergic acid, among others, are controlled substances as well. Other regulated precursors include safrole, piperonal, MDP2P, ergocristine, ergonovine (ergometrine), and ergotamine, among others.

Although not technically a serotonergic psychedelic, the oneirogen ibogaine, a constituent of Tabernanthe iboga and a compound structurally related to tryptamine psychedelics, is also an explicitly controlled substance in the United States.

In addition to psychedelics being defined as controlled substances at the federal level, individual U.S. states, such as Alabama, may also make psychedelics controlled substances within their jurisdictions. Conversely, state-level and lower jurisdictions may alternatively legalize or decriminalize psychedelics, for instance Colorado and Oregon and individual cities like San Francisco. This can result in legal conflict and ambiguity at different levels of government, for example a given drug being illegal at the federal level but legal at the state level.

=== Isomers of controlled psychedelics ===
In addition to explicitly controlled psychedelics, isomers of these compounds, for instance positional isomers, are controlled substances similarly under a new rule that became effective in 2008. Some examples of compounds affected by this rule, as explicitly defined by the DEA, include the following:

- Tryptamines: N-methyltryptamine (NMT) (isomer of AMT) and methylisopropyltryptamine (MiPT) (isomer of DET)
  - Methoxytryptamines: 4-MeO-DMT (isomer of 5-MeO-DMT) and 5-MeO-DPT (isomer of 5-MeO-DiPT)
  - Hydroxytryptamines: 6-HO-DMT and 7-HO-DMT (both isomers of psilocin (4-HO-DMT))
- Phenethylamines:
  - Scalines: escaline (isomer of TMA)
  - 2Cs: 2C-G (isomer of 2C-E and DOM)
  - Amphetamines:
    - DOx TMA-2 (2,4,5-TMA) (isomer of TMA), Aleph-2 (isomer of 2C-T-4), and Aleph-4 (isomer of 2C-T-7)
    - 4Cs: Ariadne (isomer of DOET)
    - MDxx: MBDB (isomer of MDEA
    - Others: TMA-6 (2,4,6-TMA) (isomer of TMA)

Others have not been explicitly noted by the United States DEA but may also be considered. Examples include the DET isomers MPT and MiPT and the LSD isomers MiPLA and LAMPA, among others.

== Pending and withdrawn ==
In January 2022, the U.S. DEA proposed scheduling five additional psychedelic tryptamines, including DiPT, 4-HO-DiPT (4-OH-DiPT), 5-MeO-DET, 5-MeO-MiPT, and 5-MeO-AMT. However, they subsequently withdrew this proposal in July 2022. This followed pushback and opposition from the psychedelic community and medical industry.

In December 2023, the U.S. DEA proposed scheduling the DOx psychedelics DOC and DOI. As of late 2025, despite opposition to this proposal as well, these drugs are poised to become controlled substances in the near future.

== Federal Analogue Act ==
Under the United States Federal Analogue Act, compounds which are analogues of and "substantially similar" to Schedule I and Schedule II controlled substances may themselves be treated as Schedule I controlled substances. Consequent to this law, such substances may be considered illegal to sell, purchase, or possess. However, the law applies only if the compounds are intended for human consumption.

The Federal Analogue Act has been considered "void for vagueness" as the meaning of "substantially similar" is not precisely defined. In addition, the law only applies to compounds explicitly intended for human consumption. As a result, if compounds are not marketed this way, they can still be legally sold. This has resulted in such compounds being marketed as "research chemicals", "bath salts", "plant food", and "not for human consumption", even though they actually are intended for human use. Such flaws have limited the law and led to calls for reform.

== Exceptions ==
Peyote and ayahuasca, which contain mescaline and dimethyltryptamine (DMT), respectively, are exempt in certain spiritual or religious settings.

A variety of notable psychedelics, including 4-AcO-DMT (psilacetin), 4-HO-MET, dipropyltryptamine (DPT), 5-MeO-MiPT, 5-MeO-AMT, 2C-EF, 2C-B-FLY, Bromo-DragonFLY, methallylescaline (MAL), ALD-52 (1A-LSD), 1P-LSD, ETH-LAD, and LSZ, among many others, are not explicitly controlled substances nor implicitly controlled isomers of scheduled psychedelics in the United States. However, these psychedelics and others could nonetheless be considered controlled substances if intended for human consumption under the Federal Analogue Act.

== See also ==
- Psilocybin decriminalization in the United States
- Timeline of psychedelic legalization and decriminalization
- Legal status of psychedelic drugs in Canada
- Legal status of psychedelic drugs in the United Kingdom
- Legal status of psilocybin mushrooms
- Legal status of ayahuasca by country
- Legal status of psychoactive cacti by country
- Legal status of ibogaine by country
- Online illicit drug vendor
