= Decriminalize Nature =

American grassroots organization

- Logo of Decriminalize Nature
- Abbreviation: Decrim Nature, DN
- Formation: January 2019
- Founded at: Oakland, CA
- Type: 501(c)(4)
- Methods: Grow-Gather-Gift
- Main organ: Board of Directors
- Website: https://decriminalizenature.org/

Decriminalize Nature is a national grassroots organization started in Oakland, California that aims to improve human health and well-being by decriminalizing and expanding access to entheogenic plants and fungi through political and community organizing, education and advocacy. Entheogens include but are not limited to psilocybe mushrooms, plants and brews that contain DMT like ayahuasca, plants that contain ibogaine, and cacti that contain mescaline. Decriminalize Nature supports and trains local leadership to pass policy, having success in multiple cities/counties nationwide so far.

== History ==
Decriminalize Nature was founded in 2019 in Oakland, California. The organization was founded by a group of individuals connected to the grassroots psychedelic/ entheogenic community in the San Francisco Bay Area. The founding members were inspired to build the organization based upon years of underground work in spiritual, therapeutic, creative, and other models of consciousness exploration. They all agreed that the idea of nature being criminalized is untenable and this criminalization led to stigmatization inhibiting people from exploring this alternative modality for healing and personal and spiritual growth. Therefore, education became a critical part of the movement. The organization quickly expanded nationwide, leading to successful decriminalization efforts across various cities in the United States.

Oakland became the first city to pass a resolution decriminalizing entheogenic plants and fungi on June 4, 2019. The Oakland City Council's unanimous decision set a precedent for other cities to follow The resolution was heavily influenced by research indicating the efficacy of substances like psilocybin and ayahuasca in treating mental health conditions and catalyzing personal and spiritual growth.

Following Oakland's example, several other cities and jurisdictions across the United States have passed Decriminalize Nature resolutions including, but not limited to, Santa Cruz, California; Ann Arbor, Michigan; Washington, D.C, Seattle, Washington Detroit, Michigan, Somerville, Massachusetts, Cambridge, Massachusetts, Port Townsend, WA, Arcata, California, Hazel Park, Michigan, Ferndale, Michigan, Jefferson County, Washington, Eureka, California, Berkeley, California, San Francisco, California, Ypsilanti, Michigan, Olympia, Washington, Tacoma, Washington, Jackson, Michigan. King's County, Washington, and Nevada City, California. The success of Decriminalize Nature in Ann Arbor, Michigan inspired the Washtenaw County District Attorney to expand decriminalization throughout the county by a public policy directive. In 2021, Grand Rapids, Michigan city council voted to support decriminalization policies but did not decriminalize entheogens in the city yet. City/county level Decriminalize Nature policy affects over 5 million people across the US: California (1,446,303); Washington (1,077,547); Michigan (1,060,894); Washington DC (686,995); Minnesota (423,250); Massachusetts (244,954) and Maine (69,307). If Colorado statewide decriminalization is included, that is well over 11.5 million people living in an effectively decriminalized area. The Decriminalize Nature movement continues to grow, with over 30 cities and counties passed from 2019 to 2026, advocating for policy changes at local, state, and federal levels.

== Objectives ==
Decriminalize Nature aims to:

- Educate the public: Increase awareness about the benefits and risks of entheogenic plants and fungi, emphasizing their historical and cultural significance.
- Promote research: Advocate for more scientific research into the therapeutic uses of these substances.
- Policy reform: Push for the decriminalization of entheogenic plants and fungi, removing criminal penalties for their use, possession, sharing, and cultivation.
- Risk reduction: Encourage safe and informed use of entheogens, including the development of community guidelines and support networks.

== Ethos and methodology ==
A core aspect of the movement is the "Grow - Gather - Gift" model, which decriminalizes the cultivation, gathering, and sharing of entheogenic plants and fungi within the community. This model empowers individuals to grow their own entheogens, gather them in nature or community settings, and share them with others, thereby reducing dependency on pharmaceutical companies and fostering self-sufficiency. Decriminalize Nature advocates for decriminalization as the first and foremost step before any legalization or medicalization models are considered. The organization emphasizes that decriminalization should not be repealed by subsequent models and calls for the federal de-scheduling of entheogenic plants and fungi to remove all criminal penalties.

A recent study titled Perceptions of Psychedelic Decriminalization: Findings from a Community Survey of People Who Use Psychedelics shows the benefits of decriminalization policy in the cities that have passed. In effectively decriminalized areas, 84% of the participants reported improvements with legal risk, social acceptance, and substance availability, quality, and safety. According to the study, decriminalization improved the social acceptance (de-stigmatization) for people using psychedelics in those areas, but also improved the overall opinion on psychedelic therapy. The results led Decriminalize Nature co-founder, Dr. Larry Norris, PhD to remark in an interview

"Some clinical practitioners and legalization lobbyists write off decriminalization as the 'wild west' or 'not viable' as if it is a competition. That attitude attempts to disempower community based healing and forces a cost-prohibitive gatekeeper mentality. Despite their best efforts to muddy the waters, decriminalization is not a competitor with psychedelic therapy,"

== See also ==
- Legal status of psychedelic drugs in the United States
- Psilocybin decriminalization in the United States
- Timeline of psychedelic legalization and decriminalization
