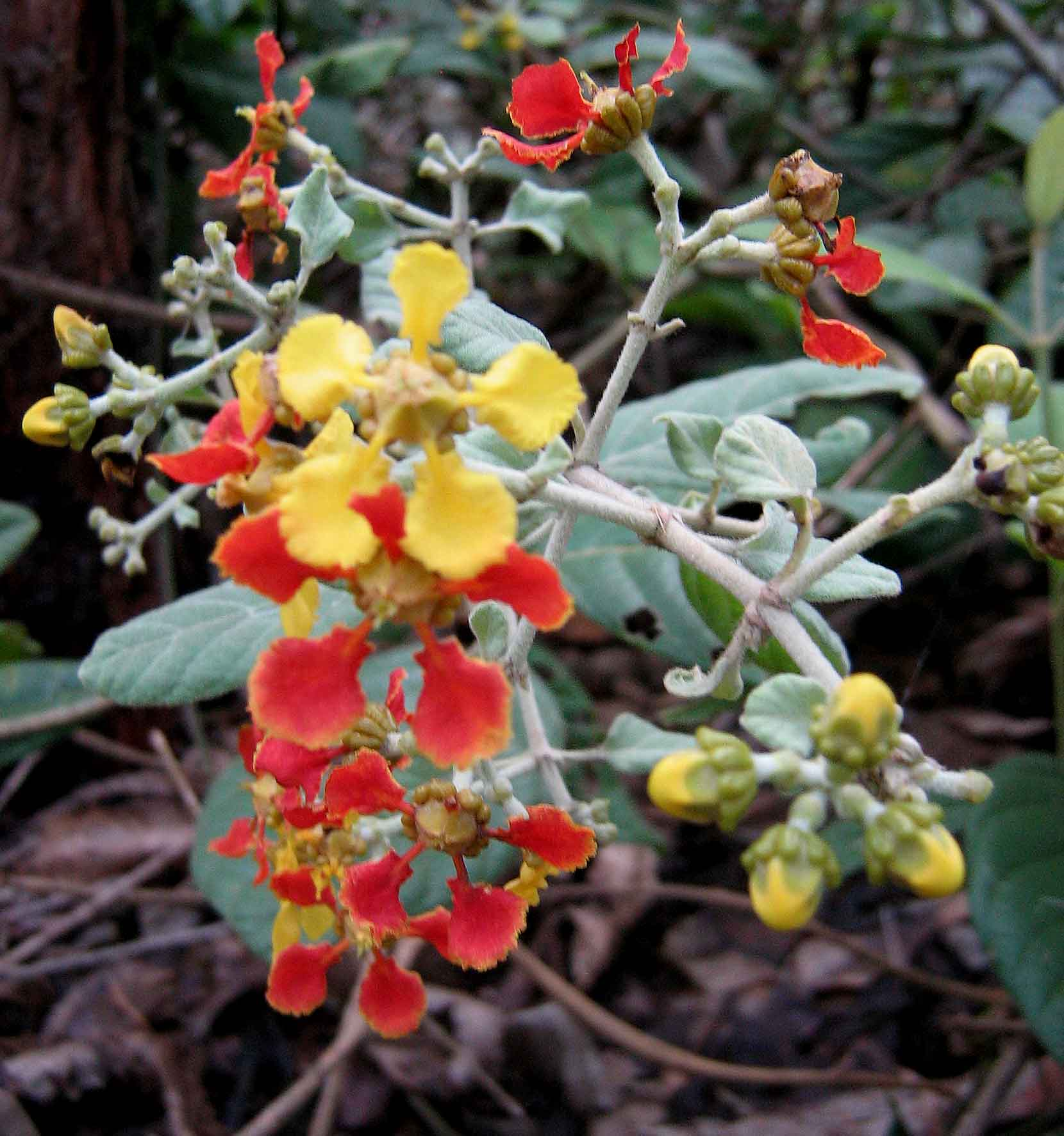
- Tetrapterys phlomoides

Scientific classification
- Kingdom: Plantae
- Clade: Tracheophytes
- Clade: Angiosperms
- Clade: Eudicots
- Clade: Rosids
- Order: Malpighiales
- Family: Malpighiaceae
- Genus: Tetrapterys; Cav.

Species
- See text

Synonyms
- Adenoporces Small; Tetrapteris orth. var.

= Tetrapterys =

Genus of Malpighiaceae plants

Tetrapterys is a genus of flowering plants in the family Malpighiaceae, native to Latin America and the Caribbean, from Mexico through to Argentina, but excluding Chile. Small trees, shrubs or vines, they are known to be toxic to livestock if consumed for long periods of time, and T. mucronata and T. styloptera (formerly T. methystica) have hallucinogenic effects in humans similar to ayahuasca.

== Species ==
Currently accepted species include:

- Tetrapterys acapulcensis Kunth
- Tetrapterys aequalis C.Wright
- Tetrapterys amazonica C.E.Anderson
- Tetrapterys ambigua (A.Juss.) Nied.
- Tetrapterys andersonii C.E.Anderson
- Tetrapterys anisoptera A.Juss.
- Tetrapterys anomala W.R.Anderson
- Tetrapterys arcana C.V.Morton
- Tetrapterys argentea Bertol.
- Tetrapterys aristeguietae W.R.Anderson
- Tetrapterys benthamii Triana & Planch.
- Tetrapterys buxifolia Cav.
- Tetrapterys callejasii W.R.Anderson
- Tetrapterys calophylla A.Juss.
- Tetrapterys cardiophylla Nied.
- Tetrapterys chamaecerasifolia A.Juss.
- Tetrapterys chloroptera Cuatrec.
- Tetrapterys citrifolia (Sw.) Pers.
- Tetrapterys complicata Moq.
- Tetrapterys cordifolia W.R.Anderson
- Tetrapterys crispa A.Juss.
- Tetrapterys crotonifolia A.Juss.
- Tetrapterys dillonii W.R.Anderson
- Tetrapterys diptera Cuatrec.
- Tetrapterys discolor (G.Mey.) DC.
- Tetrapterys fimbripetala A.Juss.
- Tetrapterys goudotiana Triana & Planch.
- Tetrapterys gracilis W.R.Anderson
- Tetrapterys haitiensis Urb. & Nied.
- Tetrapterys hassleriana Nied.
- Tetrapterys helianthemifolia Griseb.
- Tetrapterys heterophylla (Griseb.) W.R.Anderson
- Tetrapterys hirsutula Cuatrec. & Croat
- Tetrapterys humilis A.Juss.
- Tetrapterys inaequalis Cav.
- Tetrapterys jamesonii Turcz.
- Tetrapterys jussieuana Nied.
- Tetrapterys longibracteata A.Juss.
- Tetrapterys magnifolia Ruiz ex Griseb.
- Tetrapterys maranhamensis A.Juss.
- Tetrapterys megalantha W.R.Anderson
- Tetrapterys mexicana Hook. & Arn.
- Tetrapterys microphylla (A.Juss.) Nied.
- Tetrapterys molinae W.R.Anderson
- Tetrapterys mollis Griseb.
- Tetrapterys monteverdensis W.R.Anderson
- Tetrapterys mortonii (J.F.Macbr.) Cuatrec.
- Tetrapterys mucronata Cav.
- Tetrapterys natans W.R.Anderson
- Tetrapterys nelsonii Rose
- Tetrapterys nitida A.Juss.
- Tetrapterys oleifolia (Benth.) Griseb.
- Tetrapterys paludosa A.Juss.
- Tetrapterys papyracea Triana & Planch.
- Tetrapterys phlomoides (Spreng.) Nied.
- Tetrapterys pohliana Nied.
- Tetrapterys pusilla Steyerm.
- Tetrapterys racemulosa A.Juss.
- Tetrapterys ramiflora A.Juss.
- Tetrapterys rhodopteron (Oliv.) Oliv.
- Tetrapterys rzedowskii W.R.Anderson
- Tetrapterys salicifolia (A.Juss.) Nied.
- Tetrapterys schiedeana Schltdl. & Cham.
- Tetrapterys seemannii Triana & Planch.
- Tetrapterys seleriana Nied.
- Tetrapterys skutchii W.R.Anderson
- Tetrapterys splendens Cuatrec.
- Tetrapterys steyermarkii W.R.Anderson
- Tetrapterys stipulacea J.F.Macbr.
- Tetrapterys styloptera A.Juss. ← Tetrapterys methystica R.E.Schult.
- Tetrapterys subaptera Cuatrec.
- Tetrapterys tinifolia Triana & Planch.
- Tetrapterys tolimensis Sprague
- Tetrapterys turnerae Mart. ex A.Juss.
- Tetrapterys tysonii Cuatrec. & Croat
- Tetrapterys vacciniifolia A.Juss.
- Tetrapterys xylosteifolia A.Juss.

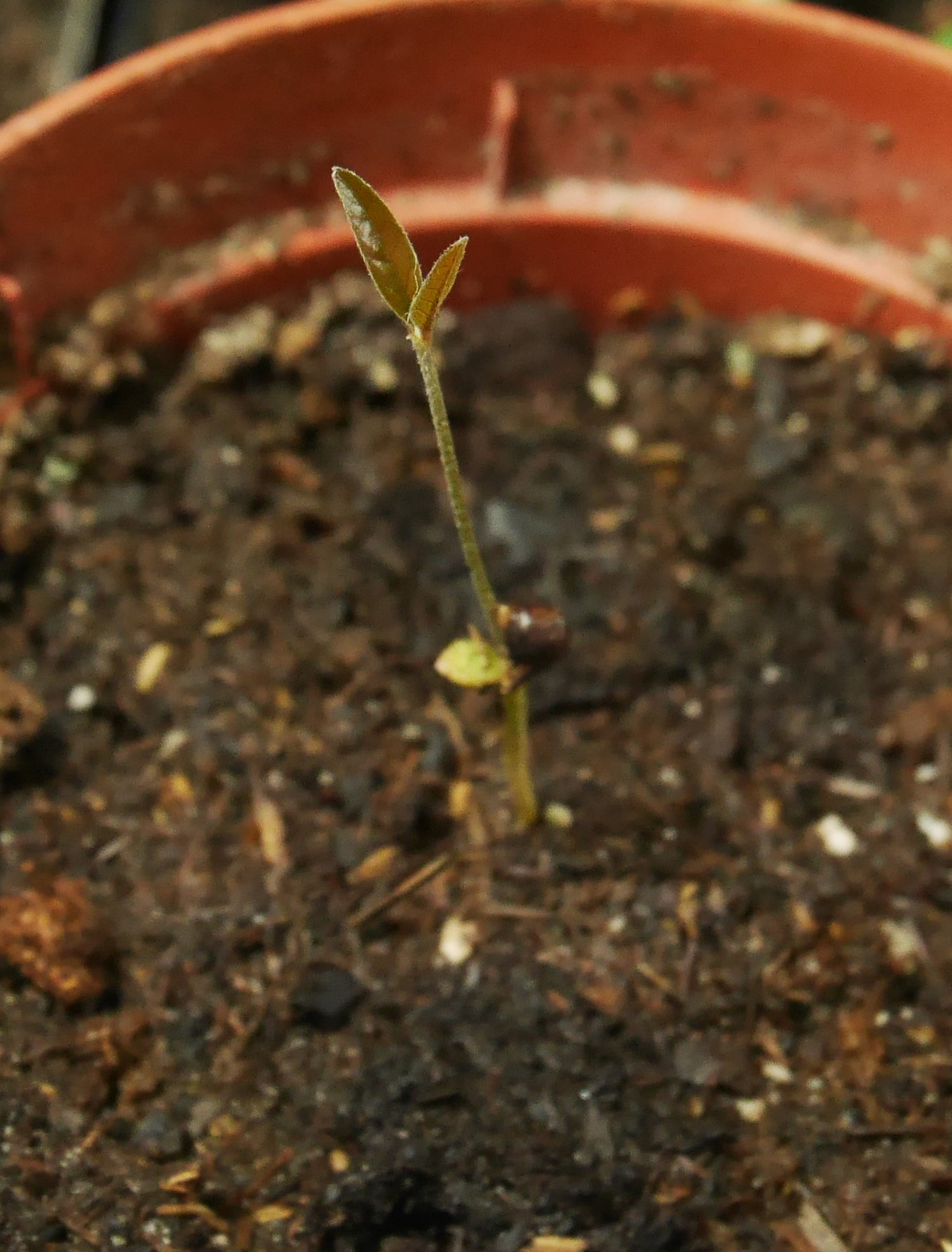
Tetrapterys styloptera seedling
