= Brett's law =

Delaware statute

Brett's Law is a name commonly given to a Delaware statute (SB259) generally prohibiting use of the psychoactive herb Salvia divinorum. The law was named after Brett Chidester (September 16, 1988 – January 23, 2006), a 17 year old who died by suicide by carbon monoxide poisoning (by lighting a charcoal grill inside a closed tent), despite the role the drug played in the incident being "unclear".

== Case ==
The law was sponsored by Delaware State Senator Karen Peterson. It was signed into law three months after the teen's death, classifying Salvia divinorum as a Delaware Schedule I controlled substance, analogous to the Federal Schedule I, making possession, use or consumption of the drug punishable as a class B misdemeanor. Peterson's largest group campaign donations in 2006 came from 'Beer, Wine & Liquor' industries.

Chidester's parents have argued that the herb played a major role in the teenager's death, and have advocated for "Schedule I"-like legislation beyond their home state of Delaware. In particular, Brett's mother, Kathleen Chidester, has continued campaigning across the United States, for example, three years after Brett's death in written testimony in support of State Senator Richard Colburn's proposed Senate Bill 9 to the Maryland General Assembly, saying: "My hope and goal is to have salvia regulated across the U.S. It's my son's legacy and I will not end my fight until this happens."

It was reported on August 3, 2007, that Chidester's parents intended to sue Ethnosupply, a Canada-based Internet company that sold Salvia divinorum to Brett some four months before his death. The parents alleged that the distributors knew salvia could be dangerous and failed to warn their son. The lawsuit sought unspecified punitive damages for their pain and suffering, lost future earnings, funeral expenses, etc. There has not been anywhere else, either before or since this incident, any other reported cases involving or alleging Salvia divinorum as a serious factor in suicide, overdose, accidental, or any other kind of death.

The National Survey on Drug Use and Health, an annual U.S.-based survey sponsored by the Substance Abuse and Mental Health Services Administration (SAMHSA), for 2006 estimated that about 1.8 million persons aged 12 or older had used Salvia divinorum in their lifetime, of which approximately 750,000 had done so in that year. The following year, 2007, saw the annual figure rise from 750,000 to 1 million U.S. users.

== Criticism ==
San Francisco attorney Alex Coolman has commented, "It's remarkable that Chidester's parents, and only Chidester's parents, continue to be cited over and over again by the mainstream media in their coverage of the supposed 'controversy' over the risks of Salvia divinorum."

Tiffin University psychologist Jonathan Appel, who co-authored a 2007 paper in the International Journal of Mental Health and Addiction on the rising popularity of salvia, expressed reluctance to draw any firm conclusions about Brett Chidester's death. "I wouldn't feel comfortable saying it caused him to commit suicide," he says. Such explanations are, "a way to try to make sense of something that's pretty senseless. We're always looking for rationalizations and reasons, particularly when there aren't any."

Bryan Roth, a psychiatrist and pharmacologist at the University of North Carolina who has led the research into how salvia's active constituent Salvinorin A works, says it remains difficult to say what role the drug might have played in Chidester's suicide. Although "it's tragic that this young guy killed himself," he says, "there's no way of knowing if salvia had anything to do with it. It would seem, given the apparent widespread use of salvia, that if these are side effects, they don't occur at very high prevalence. Otherwise, the ERs would be filled with people having bad salvia reactions."

Salvia expert Daniel Siebert has said, "He must have already had some thoughts about suicide. I don't think salvia's just going to put thoughts into peoples' heads. Mentally healthy people don't decide to take such a drastic action based on [an idea] they had during a drug state. Psychedelics basically amplify a lot of your own internal stuff. If you're already having some kind of dark thoughts, a psychedelic experience could amplify that, and it could lead to a problem for some people."

Richard Glen Boire, a senior fellow at the Center for Cognitive Liberty and Ethics, has said that the theory that using salvia encouraged Chidester to reach conclusions about the nature of life that were conducive to suicide could apply to some of the greatest pieces of art in the history of the world. "It would make Nietzsche a controlled substance. There is a lot of cultural production out there that shows a way of looking at the world that isn't all sunny and rosy."

General doubts have been raised about the potential of the use of Salvia divinorum alone to cause suicidal action. In fact, scientific literature seems to suggest that Salvia divinorum has significant anxiolytic and antidepressant effects in rodents.

== See also ==
- Teenage suicide
- Assessment of suicide risk
- Salvia divinorum
- Legal status of Salvia divinorum
