= Legal status of psychoactive cacti by country =

This is a list of the legal status of psychoactive cacti by country. This includes but is not limited to the peyote, the San Pedro and the Peruvian torch.

Country	Possession	Sale	Transport	Cultivation	Notes
Australia	Varies by state.	Varies by state.	Varies by state.	Varies by state.	Mescaline and other substances derived from it, with the exception of methoxyphenamine, are Schedule 9 prohibited substances under Australian law in all states and territories. Although legal to own in some states for ornamental gardening, it is illegal to import any plants containing Mescaline from other countries without a license. Extracting Mescaline from a cactus or otherwise preparing for consumption is illegal in all states and territories. Peyote is illegal in all states and territories, but San Pedro is legal to own, sell, transport, and cultivate in NSW, VIC, SA, and the ACT for ornamental purposes. It is illegal in all other states and territories.
Brazil	Illegal	Illegal	Illegal	Illegal	Possession, production and sale is illegal as it is listed on Portaria SVS/MS nº344
Canada	Illegal except Peyote	Illegal except Peyote	Illegal except Peyote	Legal	Mescaline and any salt thereof is illegal, but not peyote (Lophophora). Only ornamental growing is allowed.
Denmark	Illegal	Illegal	Illegal	Illegal	"Cactus and seeds of the species Echinopsis pachanoi and Echinopsis peruviana or others containing the substance mescaline are illegal. (3,4,5-trimethoxy-phenethylamin)."
Czech Republic	Legal	Legal	Legal	Legal	Cultivating or selling the cacti itself is legal.
France	Illegal	Illegal	Illegal	Peyote is regulated	Mescaline is classified as a narcotic in France by the decree of February 22, 1990 establishing the list of substances classified as narcotics
Germany	Legal	legal	Legal	Legal	Cacti are not prohibited. Mescaline is controlled under Anlage I BtMG. It is illegal to manufacture, possess, import, export, buy, sell, procure or dispense it without a license.
India	Illegal	Illegal	Illegal	Illegal	
Italy	Legal except Peyote	Legal except Peyote	Legal except Peyote	Legal except Peyote	Mescaline is listed under Table 1 of Italy's "Tabelle delle sostanze stupefacenti e psicotrope" making it illegal to purchase, transport or sell. However, psychoactive cacti (with the exception of peyote) can be legally purchased from florists, garden centers and online shops.
Ireland	Illegal	Illegal	Illegal	Illegal	Mescaline is listed under Schedule 1 of Ireland's Misuse of Drugs Act.
Mexico	Legal except peyote	Legal except peyote	Legal except peyote	Legal except peyote	The Ley General de Salud declares that mescaline and peyote are illegal. However, the San Pedro cactus and Peruvian Torch are not mentioned in it, so they are totally legal.
Netherlands	Legal	Legal	Legal	Legal	The cactus (Peyote, San Pedro...) is legal, extracted mescaline is not.
Norway	Illegal	Illegal	Illegal	Illegal	
New Zealand	Illegal	Illegal	Illegal	Legal	Mescaline is a Class A drug, and so cacti containing it can only be grown ornamentally.
Peru	Legal	Legal	Legal	Legal	
Portugal	Legal	Legal	Legal	Legal	
Switzerland	Illegal	Illegal	Illegal	Illegal	
Romania	Illegal	Illegal	Illegal	Illegal	Psychotropic plants and substances or mixtures containing such plants and substances defined under drugs and Mescaline is listed in table 1, the most restrictive under Law 143/26.07.2000.
Russia	Illegal	Illegal	Illegal	Illegal	Mescaline is List I of narcotic drugs, psychotropic substances prohibiting the purchase, transporting, and possession of substances.
Slovenia	Legal	Legal	Legal	Legal	The cactus itself is legal to grow, import and sell, but extracting the mescaline from it is illegal.
Sweden	Legal	Legal	Legal	Legal	The cactus itself is legal to grow, import and sell, but extracting the mescaline from it is illegal.
Thailand	Legal	Legal	Legal	Legal	Cacti such as peyote are not prohibited. However, mescaline, which they contain is a prohibited narcotic substance.
Ukraine	Legal	Legal	Legal	Legal	The government has excluded San Pedro Cactus (Echinopsis Pachanoi) and peyote (Lophophora Williamsii) from the list of illicit drugs, psychotropic substances and precursors. This is stated in the decision of the Cabinet of Ministers №408 dated May 23, 2012.
United Kingdom	Legal	Legal	Legal	Legal	“Hallucinogenic cacti are not illegal in the UK, unless prepared for consumption as a hallucinogen. This could include drying them, or cutting them into edible ‘buttons’.”
United States	Legal for religious use	Legal for religious use	Legal for religious use	Legal	Only peyote and mescaline itself are controlled substances in the United States. Substance: Peyote, DEA#: 7415, CSA SCH: I, NARC: N, Other names: Cactus which contains mescaline Following the passage of the American Indian Religious Freedom Act Amendments of 1994, United States federal law (and many state laws) protects the harvest, possession, consumption and cultivation of peyote as part of "bona fide religious ceremonies" (the federal statute is the American Indian Religious Freedom Act, codified at 42 U.S.C. § 1996a, "Traditional Indian religious use of the peyote sacrament", exempting only use by Native American persons. US v. Boyll expanded permitted use to all persons engaged in traditional Indian use, regardless of race. All US states with the exception of Idaho and Texas allow usage by non-native, non-enrolled persons in the context of ceremonies of the Native American Church. Some states such as Arizona additionally exempt any general bona fide religious activity or spiritual intent. US jurisdictions enacted these specific statutory exemptions partially in reaction to the US Supreme Court's decision in Employment Division v. Smith, 494 U.S. 872 (1990), which held that laws prohibiting the use of peyote that do not specifically exempt religious use nevertheless do not violate the Free Exercise Clause of the First Amendment. In October 2021, Seattle’s City Council approved a resolution to decriminalize noncommercial activity around non-peyote-derived mescaline.

== See also ==
- Legal status of ayahuasca by country
- Legal status of ibogaine by country
- Legal status of psilocybin mushrooms
- Legal status of psychoactive Amanita mushrooms
- Legal status of Salvia divinorum
- Legal status of psychedelic drugs in the United States
- Legal status of psychedelic drugs in the United Kingdom
- Legal status of psychedelic drugs in Canada
