= Psychoactive Substances Act 2013 =

Act of Parliament in New Zealand

Psychoactive Substances Act

New Zealand Parliament
- Royal assent: 17 July 2013
- Commenced: 18 July 2013

Legislative history
- Bill citation: Government Bill 100—1
- Introduced by: Peter Dunne
- First reading: 9 April 2013
- Status: Current legislation

The Psychoactive Substances Act 2013 is a law in New Zealand. The purpose of the Act is to regulate the availability of psychoactive substances in New Zealand to protect the health of, and minimise harm to, individuals who use psychoactive substances. The law seeks to make manufacturers test and prove their products are low-risk before they can be sold.

Testing is expected to cost manufacturers $1 to 2 million dollars. There is also an $180,000 application fee. A later addition to the law, Section 4(f), specified that "animals must not be used in trials for the purposes of assessing whether a psychoactive product should be approved." This may mean that, in practice, approval will be difficult or impossible. So far, no manufacturing licenses have been applied for.

The Act was brought in as a reaction to widespread concerns over the 2005 deregulation, or decriminalisation, of selling psychoactive substances in New Zealand with the introduction of section 62 in the Misuse of Drugs Amendment Act 2005 and the Misuse of Drugs (Restricted Substances) Regulations 2008. These laws made psychoactive substances such as party pills and legal highs available in New Zealand in a relatively new experimental market aimed at decriminalising the production and sale of recreational drugs.
