= Timeline of psychedelic legalization and decriminalization =

Events regarding psychedelic drugs

This article contains a timeline of significant events regarding psychedelic drugs and their legalization and decriminalization for personal, religious, and/or medical use. Major psychedelics include LSD, psilocybin, mescaline, dimethyltryptamine (DMT), 5-MeO-DMT, and 2C-B. Some of these psychedelics are naturally occurring in plants, fungi, and animals, for instance in psilocybin-containing mushrooms, ayahuasca, peyote, and Sonoran Desert toad venom. This timeline also includes MDMA, which is closely related to psychedelics, but not other types of hallucinogens like ketamine, ibogaine, or cannabis.

== 1600s ==
=== 1617 ===
- Spanish colonialists broadly ban the use of various hallucinogens in Mexico.

=== 1620 ===
- Spanish colonialists more specifically ban the use of peyote in Mexico.

== 1800s ==
=== 1899 ===
- Oklahoma passes the first law banning peyote as part of anti-Native American sentiment, but the law is repealed a decade later.

== 1910s ==
=== 1916 ===
- Three anti-peyote laws are introduced into Congress in the United States between 1916 and 1918 as part of anti-Native American sentiment but fail to pass.

== 1930s ==
=== 1930 ===
- More than a dozen states in the United States ban possession of peyote as part of anti-Native American sentiment.

=== 1937 ===
- Most states in the United States west of the Mississippi River have laws restricting peyote.

== 1960s ==
=== 1962 ===
- The Kefauver–Harris Amendment is passed in the United States and research and sales of experimental drugs including psychedelics are thereby restricted.

=== 1963 ===
- Psychedelics first discussed by a United Nations drug policy body.

=== 1965 ===
- Psychedelics are banned in New York.

=== 1966 ===
- Psychedelics like LSD are banned in California and certain other states.
- LSD is banned in the United Kingdom.
- The Commission on Narcotic Drugs (CND) within the United Nations recommended global control of psychedelics.

=== 1967 ===
- Both the World Health Organization (WHO) and United Nations Economic and Social Council (ECOSOC) issue resolutions recommending all nations to ban psychedelics.

=== 1968 ===
- The Staggers–Dodd Bill criminalizes LSD and psilocybin in the United States, but was not heavily enforced.
- LSD and dimethyltryptamine (DMT) are banned in Canada.

=== 1969 ===
- The World Health Organization (WHO) suggested that the new international drug treaty by the United Nations would aptly control psychedelics in Schedule I.

== 1970s ==
=== 1970 ===
- The Comprehensive Drug Abuse Prevention and Control Act of 1970 bans psychedelics including LSD, psilocybin, psilocin, mescaline, peyote, dimethyltryptamine (DMT), and MDA in the United States, placing them in Schedule I.

=== 1971 ===
- The Convention on Psychotropic Substances by the United Nations bans psychedelics including LSD, dimethyltryptamine (DMT), mescaline, psilocybin, and psilocin among others internationally.
- The Misuse of Drugs Act 1971 bans psychedelics including LSD, dimethyltryptamine (DMT), mescaline, psilocybin, and psilocin among others in the United Kingdom. 5-MeO-DMT is also banned as an ether of bufotenin.

=== 1974 ===
- Canada bans psilocybin.
- The Supreme Court of Spain decriminalizes possession of small amounts of drugs, including psychedelics.
- Uruguay legalizes possession of small amounts of drugs, including psychedelics.

=== 1977 ===
- The United Kingdom introduces structural blanket bans that ban many psychedelics including MDA, MDMA, and 2C-B among others.

=== 1978 ===
- Congress in the United States passes the American Indian Religious Freedom Act, which enshrines protections for Native American religious practices including peyote use and possession.

=== 1979 ===
- The Native American Church of New York (renamed to the Temple of the True Inner Light in 1980 and not actually Native American) sues for the right to use various psychedelics for religious purposes in the United States but largely loses the case.

== 1980s ==
=== 1982 ===
- Spain formally decriminalizes possession of small amounts of drugs, including psychedelics.

=== 1985 ===
- MDMA is banned and placed in Schedule I in the United States.

=== 1986 ===
- The United Nations bans MDMA internationally.
- The United States passes the Federal Analogue Act, banning designer drugs structurally similar to existing controlled substances, including psychedelics.
- The Multidisciplinary Association for Psychedelic Studies (MAPS) is founded by Rick Doblin in response to the United States banning MDMA, with the aim of working towards legal therapeutic use of psychedelics.
- Brazil legalizes the use of ayahuasca for religious purposes.

=== 1988 ===
- Switzerland legalizes limited use of LSD and MDMA in therapeutic settings.

== 1990s ==
=== 1990 ===
- The United States Supreme Court rules that use and possession of peyote for religious purposes is illegal, overriding Congress.
- Czech Republic (Czechia) decriminalizes possession of small amounts of drugs, including psychedelics.

=== 1992 ===
- Brazil permanently legalizes the use of ayahuasca for religious purposes.

=== 1993 ===
- Congress in the United States passes the Religious Freedom Restoration Act to reverse the 1990 Supreme Court ruling on peyote religious legality.
- Switzerland ends legal use of LSD and MDMA in therapeutic settings.

=== 1994 ===
- Congress in the United States passes the American Indian Religious Freedom Act Amendments of 1994, which explicitly legalizes use and possession of peyote for Native American religious practices.
- Colombia decriminalizes possession of drugs, including psychedelics.

=== 1995 ===
- 2C-B is banned and placed in Schedule I in the United States.

=== 1996 ===
- Canada passes the Controlled Drugs and Substances Act (CDSA) and places psychedelics, including LSD and psilocybin, in Schedule III.

== 2000s ==
=== 2001 ===
- Portugal decriminalizes personal possession of all drugs, including psychedelics.
- The United Nations bans 2C-B internationally.

=== 2005 ===
- Chile decriminalizes possession of small amounts of drugs for personal use, including psychedelics.
- The United Kingdom bans psilocybin-containing mushrooms, which had been legal in the country due to a legal loophole.

=== 2006 ===
- The United States Supreme Court rules that the União do Vegetal (UDV) can legally import and use ayahuasca for religious purposes.

=== 2008 ===
- Peru legalizes the use of ayahuasca for religious purposes.
- The Netherlands bans psilocybin-containing mushrooms, though "magic truffles" remain unaffected.

=== 2009 ===
- A federal court in the United States rules that the Church of the Holy Light of the Queen, a Santo Daime church, can legally import and use ayahuasca for religious purposes.
- Argentina decriminalizes possession of psychedelics, though the legal situation remains mixed.
- Mexico decriminalizes possession of small amounts of drugs including LSD, MDA, and MDMA.

== 2010s ==
=== 2010 ===
- The Czech Republic decriminalizes possession of small amounts of psychedelics including psilocybin, LSD, MDMA, and peyote.

=== 2011 ===
- 5-MeO-DMT is banned and placed in Schedule I in the United States.

=== 2012 ===
- Croatia decriminalizes possession of small amounts of drugs, including psychedelics.

=== 2013 ===
- New Zealand passes the Psychoactive Substances Act, allowing government-licensed sale of psychoactive drugs including psychedelics.

=== 2014 ===
- New Zealand passes the Psychoactive Substances Amendment Act, effectively reversing much of the 2013 act.
- Switzerland once again legalizes medical use of certain psychedelics including LSD, psilocybin, and MDMA.
- Flor da Mãe Divina (Flower of the Divine Mother), a Santo Daime church in California, applies for and obtains a permit from the Drug Enforcement Administration (DEA) to legally use ayahuasca for religious purposes.

=== 2016 ===
- Austria decriminalizes drug possession for personal use including psychedelics.

=== 2017 ===
- The United States Food and Drug Administration (FDA) designates MDMA-assisted therapy for treatment of post-traumatic stress disorder (PTSD) as a breakthrough therapy.

=== 2018 ===
- The United States Food and Drug Administration (FDA) designates psilocybin for treatment-resistant depression (TRD) as a breakthrough therapy.

=== 2019 ===
- Decriminalize Nature is founded in the United States and starts campaigning for decriminalization of naturally occurring entheogens.
- Denver, Colorado votes to decriminalize psilocybin-containing mushrooms, becoming the first city in the United States to do so.
- Oakland, California votes to decriminalize plants and fungi containing psychedelics including dimethyltryptamine (DMT), mescaline, and psilocybin following campaigning by Decriminalize Nature.
- Israel approves compassionate use program of MDMA for post-traumatic stress disorder (PTSD) in medical settings, becoming the first country in the world to do so.
- The United States Food and Drug Administration (FDA) designates psilocybin for major depressive disorder (MDD) as a breakthrough therapy.

== 2020s ==
=== 2020 ===
- Santa Cruz, California votes to decriminalize psychedelics including psilocybin, ayahuasca, and peyote.
- Ann Arbor, Michigan decriminalizes all naturally occurring psychedelics, including psilocybin, ayahuasca, and peyote among others.
- Washington, D.C. decriminalizes naturally occurring psychedelic plants and fungi, including psilocybin, ayahuasca, and peyote.
- Oregon decriminalizes possession of small amounts of drugs including psychedelics and creates a legal psilocybin therapy framework, becoming the first state in the United States to do either of these things.

=== 2021 ===
- California Senate approves bill to decriminalize several major psychedelics.
- Seattle, Washington decriminalizes psilocybin-containing mushrooms, ayahuasca, and non-peyote-derived mescaline.
- Oregon's bill decriminalizing drugs including psychedelics takes effect.
- Several Massachusetts cities, including Somerville, Cambridge, Northampton, and Easthampton, pass measures deprioritizing or decriminalizing natural psychedelics.
- Detroit, Michigan decriminalizes psychedelic plants and fungi including psilocybin-containing mushrooms.

=== 2022 ===
- San Francisco, California decriminalizes psychedelic plants and fungi, including psilocybin, mescaline, and dimethyltryptamine (DMT) among others.
- Colorado decriminalizes dimethyltryptamine (DMT), mescaline (excluding peyote), psilocybin, and psilocin and becomes the second state in the United States to enact a regulated psychedelic therapy program.
- Canada adds psychedelics including psilocybin, MDMA, dimethyltryptamine (DMT), LSD, and others to its special access program for medical use.
- Thailand begins studying psilocybin-containing mushrooms for therapeutic purposes and hints at further drug law reform.
- The United States Drug Enforcement Administration (DEA) proposes scheduling five more-obscure psychedelics including 4-HO-DiPT, 5-MeO-AMT, 5-MeO-MiPT, 5-MeO-DET, and DiPT as Schedule I controlled substances. The psychedelic community prominently challenges and opposes the proposal and the DEA soon withdraws it.

=== 2023 ===
- Australia legalizes certain psychedelics for medical use, including psilocybin for treatment-resistant depression (TRD) and MDMA for post-traumatic stress disorder (PTSD).
- Berkeley, California decriminalizes personal use and possession of psychedelic plants and fungi, including those containing psilocybin, dimethyltryptamine (DMT), and mescaline (unless from peyote).
- Eureka, California decriminalizes psychedelic plants and fungi including psilocybin-containing mushrooms.
- Salem, Massachusetts decriminalizes psilocybin-containing mushrooms.
- Minneapolis, Minnesota decriminalizes a number of psychedelics from plants and fungi.
- Oregon's first legal psychedelic therapy center opens.
- California legislature passes bill to decriminalize several major psychedelics. However, California governor Gavin Newsom vetoes the bill.
- British Columbia, Canada temporarily decriminalizes possession of small amounts of drugs including psychedelics.

=== 2024 ===
- Oregon recriminalizes drugs including psychedelics, but legal psychedelic therapy continues.
- Massachusetts voters reject ballot measure to legalize natural psychedelics such as psilocybin-containing mushrooms.
- Utah approves pilot program of psychedelic therapy with psilocybin and MDMA at two major hospitals.
- Olympia, Washington effectively decriminalizes plant- and fungi-based psychedelics such as psilocybin-containing mushrooms.
- The United States Food and Drug Administration (FDA) declines to approve MDMA-assisted therapy for treatment of post-traumatic stress disorder (PTSD), citing New Drug Application (NDA) limitations and other concerns.
- The United States Food and Drug Administration (FDA) designates LSD for generalized anxiety disorder (GAD) as a breakthrough therapy.

=== 2025 ===
- Colorado's legal psychedelic therapy program goes into effect and the first "healing centers" open.
- New Mexico legalizes psychedelic therapy with psilocybin-containing mushrooms.
- Germany establishes a compassionate use program of psilocybin for medical use, the first in the European Union.
- Czech Republic (Czechia) legalizes psilocybin therapy for medical use.

=== 2026 ===
- New Jersey approves two-year pilot program of psilocybin therapy.
- King's County, Washington effectively decriminalizes entheogens.
- Massachusetts lawmakers approve bills to create pilot psychedelic therapy programs.
- British Columbia, Canada does not renew decriminalization of drugs including psychedelics.
- President Donald J. Trump signs executive order fast-tracking Food and Drug Administration (FDA) review and potential approval of three psychedelic drug candidates (two psilocybin programs and methylone) for medical use in the United States.
- Louisiana approves pilot psychedelic therapy program.
- Nevada City, California effectively decriminalizes entheogens.

== See also ==
- Decriminalize Nature
- Drug liberalization
- Legal status of psychedelic drugs
- Legal status of psilocybin mushrooms
- List of investigational hallucinogens and entactogens
- Psilocybin decriminalization in the United States
- Timeline of cannabis law
