= Legal status of ibogaine by country =

This is an overview of the legality of ibogaine by country. Ibogaine is not included on the UN International Narcotics Control Board's Green List, or List of Psychoactive Substances under International Control. However, since 1989, it has been on the list of doping substances banned by the International Olympic Committee and the International Union of Cyclists because of its stimulant properties.

Country	Possession	Sale	Transport	Cultivation	Notes
Australia	Legal	Controlled	Legal	Legal	In 2010, ibogaine was scheduled as a Schedule 4 substance on the Therapeutic Goods Administration poisons list, making it a prescription-only medicine. However, ibogaine is not a controlled substance under Australian state and federal laws, and it is legal to possess, consume, and grow plants that contain ibogaine.
Belgium	Illegal	Illegal	Illegal	Illegal	Ibogaine, as well as its isomers, are listed in Chapter 2 of the Royal Decree of 1998 on psychotropic substances, which makes it illegal to 'import, export, manufacture, possess, sell or offer for sale, deliver or acquire', except with the express permission of Minister of Public Health.
Brazil	Controlled	Controlled	Controlled	Controlled	On 14 January 2016, Ibogaine was legalized for prescription use in São Paulo, Brazil, with this legalization to extend to the rest of the country in a few months.
Canada	Controlled	Controlled	Controlled	Controlled	Health Canada added ibogaine to the Prescription Drug List (PDL) in 2017, meaning that the drug can only be obtained legally with a medical prescription. In the past, ibogaine has been seized from several providers amid concerns over heart risks.
Costa Rica	Unknown	Unknown	Unknown	Unknown	Iboga and its chemical derivative, ibogaine, is not illegal in Costa Rica but the substance is also not regulated.
Denmark	Controlled	Controlled	Illegal	Illegal	Ibogaine as well as its salts and simple derivatives are included on List B of Denmark's Executive Order 698 of 1993 on Euphoric Substances, for 'substances used for medical and scientific purposes with substantial controls', meaning it is illegal to possess or distribute it. It may be possible to administer by doctors if they receive special permission from the Ministry of Health.
Finland	Legal	Illegal	Illegal	Illegal	Since 2014, ibogaine has been listed in the 'Government regulation of psychoactive consumer market of prohibited substances', in accordance with the Finnish Narcotics Act (373/2008) 3§3.
France	Illegal	Illegal	Illegal	Illegal	'Tabernanthe iboga, Tabernanthe manii, ibogaine, its isomers, esters, ethers, and salts, whether natural or synthetic, and all preparations containing it, are included on the list of controlled substances of the French Ministry of Health, making ibogaine illegal to possess or distribute. The substance was included in 2007 following one death which was deemed to be connected to the use of iboga.
Gabon	Unknown	Unknown	Unknown	Unknown	Iboga legislation in Gabon falls under the jurisdiction of its Culture Ministry. Approval of the Culture Ministry must be granted for the export of any iboga tree products since the passage of a 1994 cultural protection law.
Germany	Unknown	Unknown	Unknown	Unknown	Ibogaine is unregulated in Germany, but for medical use it can be regulated by pharmacy rules (AMG).
Hungary	Controlled	Controlled	Controlled	Controlled	Ibogaine is listed under Section C) New Psychotropic Substances of Government Regulation 66/2012. (IV. 2) on drugs and psychotropic substances. This law makes the 'manufacture, import, export, transfer, purchase, distribution, warehousing, storage, maintenance, research, analysis, and preparation' subject to strict licensing restrictions.
Ireland	Unknown	Illegal	Illegal	Unknown	Ibogaine has not been designated as a controlled drug under the Misuse of Drugs Act 1977, which would make possession illegal. It does fall under the general provision of the Criminal Justice (Psychoactive Substances) Act 2010, which does not address possession of psychoactive substances but does criminalise their sale, import, export, and possession for sale. As with controlled drugs, exemptions can be made for medical and veterinary use of psychoactive substances. The Health Products Regulatory Authority has made no such authorization for ibogaine.
Israel	Illegal	Illegal	Illegal	Illegal	2015 - Ibogaine is prohibited for distribution by Emergency declaration on distribution of prohibited substances under the fight against the use of hazardous materials 3834, which places it under the control of The Fight against the Phenomenon of the Use of Dangerous Substances Law until 25 February 2016.
Italy	Illegal	Illegal	Illegal	Illegal	In 2016, the Italian Ministry of Health issued an update that added both 'ibogaine' and 'tabernanthe iboga plant' to Presidential Decree No. 309 (9 October 1990). Both were added to Schedule 1, as defined according to Law 79 of 16 May 2014, due to their central nervous system activity and 'hallucinogenic' properties. Possession or distribution may result in penalties including 2–12 months imprisonment.
Mexico	Unknown	Unknown	Unknown	Unknown	Ibogaine is unregulated in Mexico, therefore, it is a popular spot for ibogaine treatment.
Netherlands	Unknown	Unknown	Unknown	Unknown	The Netherlands does not prohibit ibogaine, and there are various ibogaine treatment centers available. A Dutch naturopathic practitioner received an 8-year prison sentence in 2019 after being accused of administering ibogaine to a patient, leading to the patient's death. The defendant had been accused of the same crime several years prior, also in connection with the administration of ibogaine.
New Zealand	Legal	Prescription medicine	Legal	Legal	Ibogaine was gazetted in New Zealand in 2009 as a non-approved prescription medicine.
Norway	Illegal	Illegal	Illegal	Illegal	Ibogaine is illegal in Norway (as are all tryptamine derivatives).
Portugal	Decriminalized	Decriminalized	Decriminalized	Decriminalized	In 2001, Portugal decriminalized the possession of all drugs, which includes ibogaine.
South Africa	Controlled	Controlled	Controlled	Controlled	The South African Medicine Control Council published a statement in 2016 regarding a resolution to list ibogaine as a Schedule 6/Poison substance under the Medicines and Related Substances Control Act 101 of 1965. The MCC decision effectively means that ibogaine may now be prescribed by a licensed medical professional, and is subject to certain other conditions regarding its prescription, production, import, and export.
Sweden	Illegal	Illegal	Illegal	Illegal	Ibogaine was classified as a Schedule 1 substance in Sweden, and is now visible on the Drug Administration regulations (LVFS 2011: 10) on lists of drugs, which suggests it has no medical value. As such, it is illegal to possess or distribute.
Switzerland	Illegal	Illegal	Illegal	Illegal	Ibogaine is classified as a prohibited substance on the Regulation of the EDI on the lists of narcotics, psychotropic substances, precursors, and auxiliary chemicals. As such, it is subject to the prohibitions stated in the Federal Law on Narcotic Drugs and Psychotropic Substances, which make it illegal to possess, grow, import, manufacture, or distribute.
United Kingdom	Illegal to possess with intent to supply or possess on custodial premises	Illegal	Illegal	Illegal	Ibogaine is not identified by name in the UK's Misuse of Drugs Act 1971. However, since 2016, it falls under the provisions of the Psychoactive Substances Act 2016. The act makes it a criminal offense to import, export, produce, or supply any substance that 'is capable of producing a psychoactive effect in a person who consumes it.' It also makes it illegal to possess a psychoactive substance in a prison or other custodial institution. To date, there have been no cases of people being prosecuted in relation to possession of ibogaine.
United States	Illegal	Illegal	Illegal	Illegal	Ibogaine is classified as a Schedule I-controlled substance in the United States and is not approved there for addiction treatment (or any other therapeutic use) because of its hallucinogenic, neurotoxic, and cardiovascular side effects as well as the scarcity of safety and efficacy data in human subjects.
Uruguay	Legal	Controlled	Controlled	Controlled	Uruguay is one of a few countries that never criminalized the possession of drugs for personal use. Since 1974, the law establishes no quantity limits, leaving it to the judge's discretion to determine whether the intent was personal use.

== See also ==
- Legal status of ayahuasca by country
- Legal status of psilocybin mushrooms
- Legal status of psychoactive Amanita mushrooms
- Legal status of psychoactive cactus by country
- Legal status of Salvia divinorum
