= Louisiana State Act 159 =

Outlawing hallucinogenic plants in the state of Louisiana

Signed into law June 28, 2005, and effective August 8, 2005, Louisiana State Act No 159 found in, Louisiana RS 40:989.1, outlawed the cultivation, possession or sale of 40 named plants defined as hallucinogenic in the state of Louisiana, US. House Bill 173 of 2010 further restricted the sale and possession of herbs in the state. However, use of the plants "strictly for aesthetic, landscaping, or decorative purposes" was allowed. The list contained as many as thirty legitimate herbs of commerce which had no hallucinogenic properties. The law was amended in 2015 to allow certain herbs that had been banned by the state to again be sold in dietary supplement products.

== Plants ==
The following were declared to be "hallucinogenic plants" by the bill:

- Amanita muscaria (a fungus, not a plant)
- Anadenanthera colubrina
- Anadenanthera peregrina
- Atropa belladonna
- Banisteriopsis spp.
- Brugmansia arborea
- Brunfelsia spp.
- Calea zacatechichi
- Conocybe spp. (a genus of fungi, not plants)
- Datura spp.
- Erythrina spp. (spelled Erythina in the bill)
- Genista canariensis
- Heimia salicifolia (spelled Heimia salicfolia in the bill)
- Hyoscyamus niger
- Ipomoea violacea
- Kaempferia galanga
- Lagochilus inebrians (spelled Lagoehilus inebrians in the bill)
- Latua pubiflora (syn. Lycioplesium pubiflorum)
- Mandragora officinarum
- Mesembryanthemum spp.
- Methysticodendron amesianum
- Mimosa hostilis
- Oldmedioperebea sclerophylla (spelled Olmedioperebea sclerophylla in the bill; syn. Maquira sclerophylla)
- Panaeolus spp. (a genus of fungi, not plants)
- Pancratium trianthum (spelled Pancreatium trianthum in the bill)
- Peganum harmala
- Physalis subglabrata
- Prestonia amazonica (syn. Haemadictyon amazonicum)
- Psilocybe spp. (a genus of fungi, not plants)
- Rhynchosia spp.
- Rivea corymbosa
- Salvia divinorum
- Solanum carolinense
- Sophora secundiflora
- Stropharia spp. (a genus of fungi, not plants)
- Tabernanthe iboga
- Tetrapteris methystica
- Vinca rosea (syn. Catharanthus roseus)
- Virola spp.
