= Psychoactive Substances Act 2016 =

Act of the Parliament of the United Kingdom

Psychoactive Substances Act 2016 (Note: Section 63(4).)
- Act of Parliament
- Parliament of the United Kingdom
- Long title: An Act to make provision about psychoactive substances; and for connected purposes.
- Citation: 2016 c. 2
- Introduced by: Theresa May, Home Secretary (Commons); Lord Bates, Minister of State for Home Affairs (Lords)
- Territorial extent: England and Wales; Scotland; Northern Ireland; (Note: Section 62. Amendments and repeals from this act to section 75 the Armed Forces Act 2006 ("power of service policeman to stop and search persons, vehicles etc") may also be extended to the Channel Islands, the Isle of Man and British Overseas Territories under the provisions of the Armed Forces Act 2006.)

Dates
- Royal assent: 28 January 2016
- Commencement: 26 May 2016 (Note: Section 63(1)–(3). The Psychoactive Substances Act 2016 (Commencement) Regulations 2016 (SI 2016/553).)
Other legislation
Amends	Proceeds of Crime Act 2002; Police Reform Act 2002; Police (Northern Ireland) Act 2003; Licensing Act 2003; Gambling Act 2005; Armed Forces Act 2006; Serious Crime Act 2007; Policing and Crime Act 2009
Repeals/revokes	Intoxicating Substances (Supply) Act 1985
Amended by	Policing and Crime Act 2017; Sentencing Act 2020

Status: Amended

History of passage through Parliament

Text of statute as originally enacted

Revised text of statute as amended

The Psychoactive Substances Act 2016 (c. 2) is an act of the Parliament of the United Kingdom intended to restrict the production, sale and supply of a new class of psychoactive substances often referred to as "legal highs". The bill was given Royal Assent on 28 January 2016, and came into force on 26 May 2016 across the entire United Kingdom.

== Provisions ==
The legislation defines as a "psychoactive substance" anything which "by stimulating or depressing the person’s central nervous system ... affects the person’s mental functioning or emotional state". The legislation bans all such substances but exempts alcohol, tobacco or nicotine-based products, caffeine, food and drink, medicinal products and any drug that is already regulated under the Misuse of Drugs Act 1971.

The act:

- makes it an offence to produce, supply, offer to supply, possess with intent to supply, possess on custodial premises, import or export psychoactive substances; that is, any substance intended for human consumption that is capable of producing a psychoactive effect. The maximum sentence will be seven years’ imprisonment
- excludes substances, such as food, alcohol, tobacco, nicotine, caffeine and medical products from the scope of the offence, as well as controlled drugs, which continue to be regulated by the Misuse of Drugs Act 1971
- exempts healthcare activities and approved scientific research from the offences under the act on the basis that persons engaged in such activities have a legitimate need to use psychoactive substances in their work
- includes provision for civil sanctions – prohibition notices, premises notices, prohibition orders and premises orders (breach of the two orders will be a criminal offence) – to enable the police and local authorities to adopt a graded response to the supply of psychoactive substances in appropriate cases
- provides powers to stop and search persons, vehicles and vessels, enter and search premises in accordance with a warrant, and to seize and destroy psychoactive substances

The act also makes those offences punishable by a fine, or by up to a year in prison (six months in Northern Ireland) if convicted as a summary offence, or up to seven years if convicted under indictment. The act also defines an offence of possession in a custodial institution (prison, young offenders institution etc.) which has the same penalties as the other offences, except the maximum prison term if convicted under indictment is two years.

The act also describes a series of aggravating factors which judges or magistrates are obliged to consider in sentencing. These are:

- the offence taking place in, or in the vicinity of, a school during, or within one hour of, the school's operational hours
- the use of a courier aged under 18
- the offence taking place in a custodial institution

== Implementation ==
In 2015, Home Office minister Mike Penning wrote a letter to representatives of the Roman Catholic Church and the Church of England to try to reassure them that incense would not fall under the jurisdiction of the bill and that churches would not face prosecution for the use of incense during worship.

The act was due to come into force on 6 April 2016. It was delayed indefinitely due to a lack of clarity as to what the meaning of "psychoactive" was, and what substances were covered by the legislation. It eventually came into effect on 26 May 2016. The Advisory Council on the Misuse of Drugs also told the Government that alkyl nitrites (poppers) were not covered by the legislation as they were not considered psychoactive, as they affected the muscles and not the central nervous system. The Government accepted this advice and stated that poppers are not illegal under the act, and are not listed as exempted substances in Schedule 1 of the act.

== Case law ==
In 2017, the Court of Appeal held in Chapman that nitrous oxide was not exempted from the act as a medicinal product. A subsequent case also concerning nitrous oxide considered whether the inducing of a psychoactive effect (as required for prosecution of offences under the act) had to be the direct purpose of the substance, or could be an indirect effect. The Court of Appeal concluded that the act's provisions applied in both situations.

== Criticism ==
The law has been criticised as an infringement on civil liberties. Barrister Matthew Scott described the act as an attempt to "ban pleasure", saying it could drastically overreach by banning areca nuts, nutmegs, nicotine and tobacco products, caffeine products (including naturally caffeinated chocolate, tea, and coffee), nitrous oxide, poppers (alkyl nitrites), additives used in vaporisers and electronic cigarettes, CBD products, alcoholic beverages, hops-containing pillows, and the sale of toads and salamanders that naturally produce psychoactive substances like bufo alvarius. Scott went further and suggested it may also ban flowers and perfumes as the scents can produce an emotional response. He described it as "bad legislation", compared its drafting with the Dangerous Dogs Act 1991, and described it as incompatible with a conservative philosophy of only banning something when there is clear evidence of harm.

The government's own Advisory Council on the Misuse of Drugs (ACMD) said the law was unworkable as "the psychoactivity of a substance cannot be unequivocally proven", and that it would potentially impede scientific progress by restricting medical research.

Psychopharmacologist and former member of the ACMD, David Nutt, said that the law's apparent ban on poppers (alkyl nitrites) and nitrous oxide was difficult to reconcile with how safe those drugs are in practice, and argued that the (then presumed) ban on poppers was specifically aimed at gay men. The gay rights campaigning group Stonewall said that unless evidence suggested that poppers did any harm, they should be excluded from the ban.

Drugs reformer and founder of the Beckley Foundation, Amanda Feilding, claimed the act is bad legislation and a mistake for multiple reasons. She criticised the act for pushing the market underground, meaning users and addicts will have to resort to purchasing from criminals. She also stated the act hampers legitimate research, such as varying drugs effects on illnesses such as depression. Along with these issues she criticised the legislation and the government for trampling on people's personal freedoms and liberties.

== See also ==
- Drug policy of the United Kingdom
- Legal status of psychedelic drugs in the United Kingdom
