= CPRS =

CPRS may refer to:

== Organisations ==
- Canadian Public Relations Society, a professional society for public relations practitioners
- Central Policy Review Staff, a government "think-tank" in the British Cabinet Office, 1971-1983
- Chinese Painting Research Society, an early 20th-century Chinese organisation which counted Li Yanshan among its members
- Rio Grande do Sul Ports Captaincy (Portuguese: Capitania dos Portos do Rio Grande do Sul), part of the 5th Naval District Command of the Brazilian Navy
- Canadian Pacific Railway, a North American Class I railroad
- California Park & Recreation Society

== Other ==
- Carbon Pollution Reduction Scheme, a proposed emissions trading scheme in Australia
- Comprehensive Psychopathological Rating Scale, a rating scale for psychiatric symptoms and behaviour
- Canadian Performing Rights Society, the original name of the Composers, Authors and Publishers Association of Canada
- Computerized Patient Record System, the primary clinical health application for the U.S Department of Veterans Affairs' VistA health information system
- Controlled Premium Rate Services, United Kingdom telephone numbers subject to additional regulation

== See also ==
- CPR (disambiguation)
- Complex regional pain syndrome (CRPS), a disorder of a portion of the body which manifests as extreme pain and other symptoms
