= CPR (disambiguation) =

Cardiopulmonary resuscitation (CPR) is an emergency procedure to assist someone who has suffered cardiac arrest.

CPR may also refer to:

== Science and technology ==
- Candidate phyla radiation, bacteria precursors
- Classification of Pharmaco-Therapeutic Referrals, a taxonomy to define situations requiring a referral from pharmacists to physicians
- COM port redirection in computing
- Competent Persons Report, in Oil and Gas; see Lancaster oilfield
- Continuous Plankton Recorder, marine biological monitoring program
- Curved planar reconstruction, in computed tomography
- Cubase Project Files, work files used in Steinberg Cubase
- Cursor Position Report, an ANSI X3.64 escape sequence
- Cytochrome P450 reductase, an enzyme

== Organizations ==
- American Bar Association Model Code of Professional Responsibility
- Center for Performance Research
- Centre for Policy Research, a think tank in New Delhi, India
- Chicago Project Room, former art gallery in Chicago and Los Angeles
- Communist Party of Réunion, in the French département of Réunion
- Communist Party of Russia (disambiguation), various meanings
- Congress for the Republic, a Tunisian political party
- Conservatives for Patients' Rights, a pressure group founded and funded by Rick Scott that argues for private insurance methods to pay for healthcare
- Det Centrale Personregister (Civil Registration System), Denmark's nationwide civil registry

== Transportation ==
- Canadian Pacific Railway, which serves major cities in Canada and the northeastern US
- Car plate recognition, or automatic number plate recognition
- Casper–Natrona County International Airport (IATA Code), in Casper, Wyoming, US
- Cornelius Pass Road, in Oregon, US
- Compact Position Reporting, a method of encoding an aircraft's latitude and longitude in ADS-B position messages
- Cipete Raya MRT station, a rapid transit station in Jakarta, Indonesia

== Entertainment and music ==
- Chicago Public Radio, former name of WBEZ
- Club Penguin Rewritten, 2017 fangame
- Colorado Public Radio
- CPR (band) or Crosby, Pevar & Raymond, a former rock/jazz band
  - CPR (album)
- Corporate Punishment Records, a record label
- CPR (EP), a 2003 EP by Dolour
- "CPR", a song by CupcakKe from Queen Elizabitch, 2017
- "CPR", a song by Wet Leg from Moisturizer, 2025

== Other uses ==
- Calendar of the Patent Rolls, a book series translating and summarising the medieval Patent Rolls documents
- Challenge Prince Rainier III, top division association football league in Monaco
- Chinese People's Republic, another alternate official name for China (UNDP country code CPR)
- Civil Procedure Rules, a civil court procedure rules for England and Wales
- Common-pool resource, a type of good, including a resource system
- Common property regime
- Concrete Pavement Restoration, a method used by the International Grooving & Grinding Association
- Conditional Prepayment Rate, a measurement for Prepayment of loan
- Condominium Property Regime, a type of condominium conversion common in Hawai'i
- Construction Products Regulation, Regulation (EU) No. 305/2011
- Critique of Pure Reason, a 1781 philosophical work by Immanuel Kant
- Corporate political responsibility, a corporate responsibility concept

== See also ==
- CPR-1000, a Generation II+ pressurized water reactor
- Central Pacific Railroad (CPRR), between California and Utah, US
- Carolwood Pacific Railroad (CPRR)
