= Corporate political responsibility =

Corporate responsibility concept

Corporate political responsibility (CPR) is a corporate responsibility concept that emphasizes the political dimension of a company's actions. The concept was developed in the 2010s as an enhancement of existing frameworks such as Corporate Social Responsibility. CPR regards the social and ecological aspects underlined by CSR as inherently connected to the political, thus highlighting the interdependence of business activities with the public realm, societal institutions and collective goods.

To navigate in this environment, which is also shaped by megatrends such as globalisation, digitisation and climate change, CPR proposes that companies systematically develop the political role they already have. Some authors argue that by building and managing their political brand and strengthening the political fabric in which they operate, companies can advance their economic interests. Others emphasize the need for a new norm for CPR, with companies recognizing limits on the legitimate use of their political influence. Numerous companies have begun to act in accordance with CPR principles, including the clothing manufacturers Nike and Adidas, the coffee shop chain Starbucks, the homestay marketplace Airbnb, the technology company IBM, and the watchmaker Nomos Glashütte.

== Background ==
Beginning in the second half of the 20th century, there has been an increased awareness of companies' impact on their social and ecological environment. Under the umbrella label of corporate responsibility, several management concepts have been proposed to encourage corporations to contribute actively to the welfare of these environments. The most established of these concepts is Corporate Social Responsibility (CSR). Since the 2004 United Nations report Who cares wins, which popularly introduced environmental, social, and governance (ESG), sustainability principles have also found consideration in financial markets. In 2007, the political scientist David Vogel observed that many companies were stepping in to remediate their environmental and social impacts by taking 'virtuous' action when faced with deficits in state governance. Efforts by the sportswear manufacturer Nike to contribute to governance by observing self-imposed labor and environmental standards in its international factories, after facing strong pressure from activist groups, have been cited as an example of this approach.

In the 21st century, scholars and practitioners began to argue that corporate responsibility should extend to the political sphere, particularly since national governments have become increasingly challenged to provide effective governance services in the face of global challenges such as climate change and digitisation, a phenomenon known as the "governance gap." One of the important early steps in this direction was the formation in 2003 of the Center for Political Accountability in Washington, DC, which focuses on corporate electoral spending. During the 2010s, such ideas were developed into a comprehensive new corporate responsibility concept named Corporate Political Responsibility (CPR), emphasizing the political dimension of sustainability as an essential complement to the social and the ecological. According to the business ethics magazine Forum Wirtschaftsethik, the term was introduced by the German political scientist and advisor Johannes Bohnen. In a 2015 article in Zeitschrift für Politikberatung, he argued that political factors are foundational for social, ecological and economic concerns, and recommended CPR as a strategic evolution of corporate responsibility concepts. The term CPR was independently introduced in English by the American economist Thomas P. Lyon and his colleagues in a 2018 article in 'California Management Review', which argued that corporate political action has as much impact as corporate CSR efforts, so activists and investors who care about CSR should place at least as much emphasis on CPR. They noted that ESG ratings have been slow to incorporate measures of corporate political activity, but in the last few years ESG criteria have gradually been expanded to include companies' political actions.

== Concept ==
=== Basic principles ===
At the center of CPR is the observation that companies are already political actors: they advance their interests through lobbying, interact with diverse regulatory environments, and they are bound up with the state in their role as taxpayers and employers. Since the emergence of stakeholder capitalism, which emphasizes companies' responsibilities towards numerous constituencies impacted by their business activity (such as customers, employees, investors, and suppliers), there has been an increased public expectation that companies show awareness of their existing political role. The Edelman Trust Barometer, an annual survey gauging public trust in societal actors, found in 2020 that 92% of respondents wanted their employer to speak out more on political issues. CPR proposes measures that sustainably strengthen institutional and cultural pillars of open societies and thereby also serve to advance business interests, in line with United Nations Sustainable Development Goal 16, which calls for the development of "strong institutions."

Advocates of the concept nevertheless stress that companies should recognize boundaries to their legitimate role in the political process, and to avoid crowding out democratic civic institutions and processes. In addition, civil society actors and resources such as Transparency International, the OECD Guidelines for Multinational Enterprises, and the Responsible Lobbying Framework recognize the potential for corporations to exercise undue political influence, capture regulatory processes or block competition.

=== Political branding ===
In a 2021 book on CPR, Bohnen argues that companies should move away from equating the political solely with party politics: democratic politics extends to all actors of society (including businesses) when they engage in political debates and provide public goods. Given the increased public expectations that companies show awareness of their role as political actors, he recommends that they embrace taking a political stance in accordance with their corporate purpose.

Companies can then enter into a process called 'Political branding', which serves to operationalise their political stance. In an exercise of political brand creation, a company's existing political actions and resources are consolidated into a coherent political leitmotif, respectively. Political brand management is then needed to develop and implement CPR activities. Bohnen distinguishes between four fields of action: 'responsible lobbying', 'political statement[s]' on business-relevant political topics (particularly by means of CEO activism), 'participation projects' (such as community dialogue platforms), and the 'provision of public goods' (such as infrastructure, education and sport facilities). When engaging in CPR activities, companies support the state but must at the same time respect the primacy of politics. Bohnen stresses that CPR is also a 'business case': by contributing to the maintenance of robust societal institutions, collective goods and democratic infrastructure, companies invest in the political pre-conditions of their own economic success, thus broadening traditional notions of investment, and strengthen their brand in the eyes of customers.

=== The Erb Principles for Corporate Political Responsibility ===
A Taskforce of business leaders convened and led by the University of Michigan's Erb Institute proposes four principles upon which responsible corporate political action should be based. "Responsibility" calls for active support for the “systems on which the economy, society and life depend”, including healthy market “rules of the game” that foster competition; “constitutional democracy; the rule of law [and] civic freedoms,” healthy civic discourse, and avoiding adverse impacts on the environment and human rights. "Legitimacy" determines whether a firm has a legitimate basis for entering the political arena on a given issue. It requires that companies' political activities authentically reflect the firm's collective stance as opposed to that of individual executives. In addition, the company must either have contributed significantly to the problem, have made commitments that relate to the issue, or see the issue of one of such consequence that it threatens fundamental systems and the firm has the ability to help. "Accountability" demands that firms align their political actions with their professed corporate mission, vision, and values. "Transparency" prescribes "open and honest" communication with stakeholders about the company's political operations. This requires going well beyond mere compliance with disclosure regulations around political spending and lobbying, as these requirements are typically too loose to give stakeholders an accurate and complete picture of corporate political activity on a given issue.

== Application ==
Numerous companies have begun to act in accordance with the principles of CPR. In 2018, Nike produced an advertisement campaign with the American football player Colin Kaepernick, who had caused controversy by kneeling during a performance of the United States national anthem to protest against racism and police violence. Nike was criticised by then president Donald Trump but eventually received a positive market reaction. The coffee shop chain Starbucks strengths the democratic process by aiding voter registration efforts with a dedicated online tool. The company was also among the first to pay for its employees' health insurance and to support their tertiary education. In 2017, the homestay marketplace Airbnb opposed the far-right Unite the Right rally in Charlottesville, Virginia by disabling the profiles of extremist users in the run-up to the event. The company's CEO, Brian Chesky, publicly condemned the rally.

The German watch manufacturer Nomos Glashütte wrote an open letter condemning racism, intolerance and hatred after far-right gains in the 2017 German federal election around its corporate headquarters in Saxony had caused irritation among customers. The firm also offered workshops to its employees to help them counter extremism and was a founding member of the Business Council for Democracy, a private-sector initiative designed to foster debating culture.

In March 2023, a group of American companies, including the technology multinational IBM and the tire manufacturer Pirelli, publicly stated their support for the Erb Principles for CPR and committed to take aligned action on them over time, in their own corporate decisions.

== See also ==
- Business ethics

== Bibliography ==
- Ackley, Kate (2023-03-07). "IBM, Pirelli Tire among companies signing political money principles". Roll Call.
- Blowfield, Michael; Murray, Allan (2014). Corporate Responsibility. Oxford: Oxford University Press. ISBN 978-0-19-967832-7.
- Bohnen, Johannes (2015). "Corporate Political Responsibility (CPR) – Warum Unternehmen sich offen politisch positionieren müssen". Zeitschrift für Politikberatung (in German). 7 (1–2): 55–8. doi:10.5771/1865-4789-2015-1-2-55. ISSN 1865-4789. JSTOR 26429576.
- Bohnen, Johannes (2021). Corporate Political Responsibility. How Business can Strengthen Democracy for Mutual Benefit. Future of Business and Finance. Berlin: Springer-Verlag. doi:10.1007/978-3-662-62122-6. ISBN 978-3-662-62121-9. S2CID 228897500.
- Dolan, Ed (2023-05-26). "How — and When — Should Companies Engage in the Political Process?". Harvard Business Review. ISSN 0017-8012.
- The Erb Principles for Corporate Political Responsibility (PDF). Erb Institute. 2022.
- "Corporate Political Responsibility-5 Fragen an ... Dr. Johannes Bohnen". Forum Wirtschaftsethik (in German). Deutsches Netzwerk Wirtschaftsethik. 2022-08-09.
- Edelman Trust Barometer 2020 (PDF). Edelman. 2020.
- Langenbucher, Florian (2021-06-25). "Neu und größer: Der Uhrenhersteller NOMOS Glashütte war einer der Vorreiter, nun wird die Demokratie-Initiative für die Wirtschaft BC4D fortgesetzt". Presseportal (in German).
- Lyon, Thomas P.; Doty, Elizabeth (2023). "The Erb Principles for Corporate Political Responsibility". Harvard Law School Forum on Corporate Governance.
- Lyon, Thomas P.; et al. (2018). "CSR Needs CPR: Corporate Sustainability and Politics". California Management Review. 4 (60): 5–23. doi:10.1177/0008125618778854. hdl:1765/112377. ISSN 0008-1256. S2CID 158605284.
- Lyon, Thomas P. (2023). "The Meaning of Corporate Political Responsibility". In Lyon, Thomas P. (ed.). Corporate Political Responsibility. Cambridge: Cambridge University Press. pp. 3–29. ISBN 978-1-009-42081-5.
- Lyon, Thomas P.; Mandelkorn, William (2023). "Measuring Corporate Political Responsibility". In Lyon, Thomas P. (ed.). Corporate Political Responsibility. Cambridge: Cambridge University Press. pp. 62–97. ISBN 978-1-009-42081-5.
- Vogel, David (2007). The Market for Virtue: The Potential and Limits of Corporate Social Responsibility. Washington, D. C.: Brookings Institution Press. ISBN 978-0-8157-9077-8.
- Winston, Andrew; Doty, Elisabeth; Lyon, Thomas (2022-10-24). "The Importance of Corporate Political Responsibility". MIT Sloan Management Review. ISSN 1532-9194.
- Zinnbauer, Dieter (2022). Corporate Political Responsibility. Mobilizing the Private Sector for Political Integrity. Stockholm: International Institute for Democracy and Electoral Assistance. doi:10.31752/idea.2022.15. ISBN 978-91-7671-531-4. S2CID 247816846.
