= Trading Up (Vogel book) =

1995 book by David Vogel

Trading Up: Consumer and Environmental Regulation in a Global Economy
- Author: David Vogel
- Language: English
- Genre: Non-fiction
- Publisher: Harvard University Press
- Publication date: 1995
- ISBN: 0-674-90084-7

Trading Up: Consumer and Environmental Regulation in a Global Economy (Harvard University Press 1995, ISBN 0-674-90084-7) is a book by UC Berkeley political scientist and business professor, David Vogel. It examines the impact of free trade on environmental regulations. It analyzes the General Agreement on Tariffs and Trade (GATT), North American Free Trade Agreement (NAFTA), the Canada-United States Free Trade Agreement, and the treaties that created the European Community and Union, and looks at cases including the GATT tuna-dolphin dispute, the EC's beef hormone ban, the Danish bottle case.

Some environmentalists have expressed concern that trade liberalization and acceptance of trade rules (with, for example, the World Trade Organization) will retard and even undermine national regulations for consumer protection and environmental improvement, as in the tuna-dolphin case. These observers are also concerned about competition among nations for footloose industries. This interesting book systematically examines the original European Community, the Single European Act, the General Agreement on Tariffs and Trade and its 1979 standards code, the U.S.-Canada Free Trade Area, and the more recent North American Free Trade Agreement, as well as the states in the free trade area of the United States. Vogel finds that, while counterexamples do exist, trade liberalization on balance has strongly reinforced environment-improving regulations. A good example is auto emissions requirements, which have gradually stiffened and leveled up in the trading system over time. Three reasons are adduced, mainly concerning the major markets. First, stiffer regulations sometimes enhance the competitive advantage of firms, thus lining up industrialists with environmentalists in an open economy. Second, these markets (California in the United States, Germany in Europe, the United States and EU in the world at large) can set product standards that outsiders have to meet. Third, to the extent they are governed by environmentally sensitive parties (mainly the United States and EU), the major economies have negotiated international agreements that foster environmental improvement.

== See also ==
- Pollution haven hypothesis
- Race to the bottom
