= David Vogel (professor) =

American scholar of business (born 1947)

David Vogel (born 1947) is the Soloman P. Lee Distinguished Professor in Business Ethics at the University of California, Berkeley. He is a member of both the Political Science Department and the Haas School of Business, and is Editor of the California Management Review. He was the Jean Monnet Chair, European University Institute, in 1994 and the BP Chair in Transatlantic Relations, there in 2000. At INSEAD he was the Novartis Professor of Management and the Environment in 2000-2001 and the Shell Fellowship in Business and the Environment in 2002.

His books include Trading Up (1995) about globalization, The Dynamics of Regulatory Change: How Globalization Affects National Regulatory Policies, (ed. with Robert Kagan 2002), and The Market for Virtue (2005) about corporate social responsibility. He has written over 50 scholarly articles.

Vogel has a BA in political science from Queens College City University of New York and a PhD in politics from Princeton University.

In 2010, David Vogel was awarded the Aspen Institute Faculty Pioneers and Dissertation Proposal Award.
