= Comprehensive Psychopathological Rating Scale =

- Purpose: measure severity of psychiatric symptoms

The Comprehensive Psychopathological Rating Scale (CPRS) is a scale for rating the severity of psychiatric symptoms and observed behaviour. CPRS was developed by Swedish psychiatrists Marie Åsberg, Carlo Perris, Daisy Schalling, and Göran Sedvall in collaboration with the British psychiatrist, Stuart Montgomery.

== Usage ==
CPRS can be used to assess the present psychiatric state, severity of symptoms, and change in symptoms over time. It consists of sixty-five items covering symptoms commonly reported by patients with mental disorders such as psychosis, mood disorders, anxiety disorders, and somatoform disorders. It takes about fifty minutes to administer, and can be used by mental health professionals of different disciplines after relatively little training.

As of 2011 the complete version of the CPRS was seldom used by clinicians or in psychiatric research. However, the ten-item sub-scale for measuring the severity of depression, called the Montgomery Åsberg Depression Rating Scale (MADRS), was the most widely used rating scale for assessment of mood both in research and clinical practice.
