= California Management Review =

- Discipline: Management, Business
- Language: English
- Edited by: David Vogel

Publication details
- History: 1958-present
- Publisher: SAGE Publishing for the Haas School of Business (United States)
- Frequency: Quarterly
- Impact factor: 7.3 (2024)

Standard abbreviations
- ISO 4: Calif. Manag. Rev.

Indexing
- ISSN: 0008-1256 (print); 2162-8564 (web)
- LCCN: 61000204
- JSTOR: 00081256
- OCLC no.: 5755713

Links
- Journal homepage; Journal at SAGE Journals; Online archive

California Management Review is a quarterly peer-reviewed academic journal on management that is affiliated with the Walter A. Haas School of Business at the University of California, Berkeley. It was established in 1958 and covers the field of business, emphasizing strategy and organization, global competition and competitiveness, and business and public policy. The journal also publishes occasional special issues, covering a particular topic. Since October 2016, the journal is published by SAGE Publications. The editor-in-chief is David Vogel (University of California, Berkeley).

The journal also manages the Berkeley-Haas Case Series, a collection of business case studies written by Haas School of Business faculty and intended for use in educational settings.

== Abstracting and indexing ==
The journal is abstracted and indexed in the Social Sciences Citation Index, Current Contents/Social & Behavioral Sciences, and Scopus. According to the Journal Citation Reports, the journal has a 2024 impact factor of 7.3.

== Best Article Award ==
Each year, the journal selects an article from the past volume to receive the annual "Best Article Award". Articles are initially judged by the editorial board. The final selection is made by a panel of business executives based on originality, relevance, and contribution to the study and practice of management. Along with a cash prize, the authors of the award-winning article are invited to Haas School to give a public lecture.
