= Communist Party of Russia =

Communist Party of Russia might refer to:

- Russian Social Democratic Labour Party, founded in 1898 – the forerunner of the Russian Communist Party (Bolsheviks)
- Communist Party of the Soviet Union, formally established in 1912 and known originally as the Russian Communist Party (Bolsheviks) and then All-Union Communist Party (Bolsheviks)
- Communist Party of the Russian Soviet Federative Socialist Republic, a short-lived (1990–1991) branch of the Communist Party of the Soviet Union
- Communist Party of the Russian Federation, formed in 1993 after the breakup of the Soviet Union
- Party of Narodnik Communists (September to November 1918), formed by a section of Left Socialist-Revolutionaries who wished to cooperate with the Bolsheviks
- Party of Revolutionary Communism (1918 to 1920), a party of Left Socialist-Revolutionaries pro-Bolshevik dissidents
- Russian Communist Workers Party, established in 1991
- Communist Party of the Soviet Union (2001)
  - Russian Communist Workers' Party of the Communist Party of the Soviet Union, established in 2001
- Communist Party "Communists of Russia", founded in 2009, registered in 2012
