= Chicago Project Room =

Contemporary art gallery in Chicago, U.S.

Coordinates: 41.89609°N 87.68104°W

Chicago Project Room (CPR) was a contemporary art gallery founded in 1996 by Michael Hall (at 2136 W. Chicago Avenue) in Chicago.

== History ==
From 1996 to 1998, Michael Hall organized solo exhibitions with emerging Chicago-based artists, such as Carol Jackson, Helen Mirra, Mindy Rose Schwartz, Jane Benson, Nick Frank and others, developing an open space for emerging artists to produce solo exhibitions.

Daniel Hug joined the gallery in 1998 and the gallery relocated to a loft in Wicker Park (1464 N. Milwaukee Ave.), during this period CPR focused on promoting a smaller group of local artists and collaborating more with international artists who had yet to exhibit in Chicago. CPR also participated in international art fairs LISTE, Basel (1999 and 2000) and Artforum Berlin among others. In summer 2000, the gallery moved to Los Angeles where it was located at 6130 Wilshire Boulevard, until its premature closure in 2002. The gallery organized many group and solo exhibitions and presented many positions for the first time in L.A., including Martin Boyce, Olaf Breuning, Torbjorn Rodland.

Michael Hall opened his eponymous gallery in Vienna from 2003 to 2007 and is now working as an Independent Curator (Vienna / Chicago). Daniel Hug later reopened in his eponymous gallery in Chinatown (L.A.) from 2003 to 2008 and has been the artistic director of Art Cologne, from 2008 to present.

== Selected exhibited artists ==
The following artists exhibited at the gallery:

- Candice Breitz
- Gaylen Gerber
- Carol Jackson
- Wendy Jacob
- Alice Könitz
- Helen Mirra
- Muntean and Rosenblum
- Henrik Plenge Jacobsen
- Jennifer Reeder
- Gerwald Rockenschaub
- Mindy Schwartz
- Thaddeus Strode
- Margaret Welsh

== Art fairs ==
Chicago Project Room participated in numerous art fairs including Art Chicago, Artforum Berlin, LISTE Basel and co-organized International Invitational (2001) at Art Chicago featuring upcoming galleries such as Asprey Jacques (London), Francesca Kaufmann (Milan), Gio Marconi (Milan), Meyer Riegger (Karlsruhe), Modern Art (London), Galleria Franco Noero (Turin), The Project (New York), Nils Staerk (Copenhagen) and The Modern Institute (Glasgow).
