= Montgomery–Åsberg Depression Rating Scale =

Diagnostic questionnaire to measure the severity of depressive episodes

- Purpose: severity of depression

The Montgomery–Åsberg Depression Rating Scale (MADRS) is a ten-item diagnostic questionnaire which mental health professionals use to measure the severity of depressive episodes in patients with mood disorders. It was designed in 1979 by British and Swedish researchers (Stuart Montgomery and Marie Åsberg) as an adjunct to the Hamilton Rating Scale for Depression (HAMD) which would be more sensitive to the changes brought on by antidepressants and other forms of treatment than the Hamilton Scale was. There is, however, a high degree of statistical correlation between scores on the two measures.

== Interpretation ==
The questionnaire includes questions on ten symptoms:

- Apparent sadness
- Reported sadness
- Inner tension
- Reduced sleep
- Reduced appetite
- Concentration difficulties
- Lassitude
- Inability to feel
- Pessimistic thoughts
- Suicidal thoughts

Each item yields a score of 0 to 6; the overall score thus ranges from 0 to 60. Higher MADRS score indicates more severe depression. Usual cutoff points are:

- 0 to 6: normal /symptom absent
- 7 to 19: mild depression
- 20 to 34: moderate depression
- 35 to 60: severe depression.

== MADRS-S ==
A self-rating version of this scale (MADRS-S) is often used in clinical practice and correlates reasonably well with expert ratings. The MADRS-S instrument has nine questions, with an overall score ranging from 0 to 54 points.

== See also ==
- Comprehensive Psychopathological Rating Scale
- Diagnostic classification and rating scales used in psychiatry
