= ADB-BINACA =

Chemical compound

Legal status
- Legal status: CA: Schedule II; DE: NpSG (Industrial and scientific use only); UK: Class B; US: Schedule I

Identifiers
- IUPAC name: N-[(2S)-1-amino-3,3-dimethyl-1-oxobutan-2-yl]-1-benzyl-1H-indazole-3-carboxamide
- CAS Number: 1185282-27-2
- PubChem CID: 129406620
- ChemSpider: 57621565
- UNII: PUVP61SOSI
- CompTox Dashboard (EPA): DTXSID501344812

Chemical and physical data
- Formula: C_{21}H_{24}N_{4}O_{2}
- Molar mass: 364.449 g·mol^{−1}
- 3D model (JSmol): Interactive image
- SMILES: O=C(NC(C(N)=O)C(C)(C)C)C1=NN(CC2=CC=CC=C2)C3=C1C=CC=C3
- InChI: InChI=1S/C21H24N4O2/c1-21(2,3)18(19(22)26)23-20(27)17-15-11-7-8-12-16(15)25(24-17)13-14-9-5-4-6-10-14/h4-12,18H,13H2,1-3H3,(H2,22,26)(H,23,27); Key:IUFIUAWRCUVUCQ-UHFFFAOYSA-N

ADB-BINACA (also known as ADMB-BZINACA using EMCDDA naming standards) is a cannabinoid designer drug that has been found as an ingredient in some synthetic cannabis products. It was originally developed by Pfizer as a potential analgesic, and is a potent agonist of the CB_{1} receptor with a binding affinity (K_{i}) of 0.33 nM and an EC_{50} of 14.7 nM.

== Adb-Butinaca ==
The analogue with a 1-butyl substitution on the indazole ring rather than 1-benzyl has also been sold as a designer drug under the name ADB-BINACA, but is now more commonly referred to as ADB-BUTINACA to avoid confusion with the benzyl compound. It is a similarly potent CB_{1} agonist, with a binding affinity of 0.29nM for CB1 and 0.91nM for CB2, and an EC_{50} of 6.36 nM for CB1.

== See also ==
- 4F-MDMB-BINACA
- 5F-AB-PINACA
- 5F-ADB
- 5F-ADB-PINACA
- ADB-CHMINACA
- ADB-FUBICA
- ADB-FUBINACA
- ADB-HEXINACA
- ADB-PINACA
- ADB-4en-PINACA
