= MDMB-5'Br-4en-PINACA =

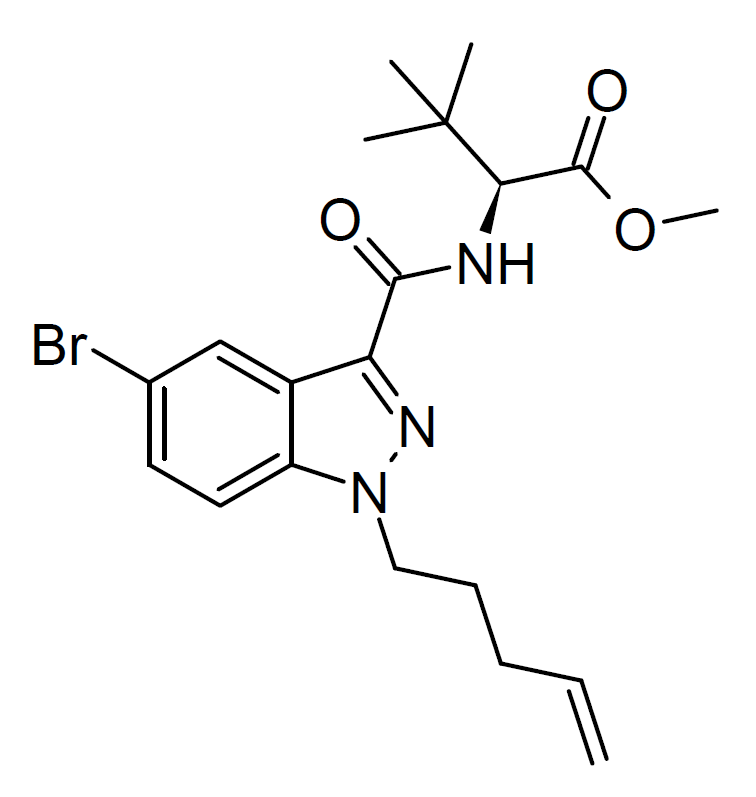

Identifiers
- IUPAC name: methyl (2S)-2-[(5-bromo-1-pent-4-enylindazole-3-carbonyl)amino]-3,3-dimethylbutanoate
- PubChem CID: 172873722
- ChemSpider: 128938084

Chemical and physical data
- Formula: C_{20}H_{26}BrN_{3}O_{3}
- Molar mass: 436.350 g·mol^{−1}
- 3D model (JSmol): Interactive image
- SMILES: CC(C)(C)[C@@H](C(=O)OC)NC(=O)C1=NN(C2=C1C=C(C=C2)Br)CCCC=C
- InChI: InChI=1S/C20H26BrN3O3/c1-6-7-8-11-24-15-10-9-13(21)12-14(15)16(23-24)18(25)22-17(19(26)27-5)20(2,3)4/h6,9-10,12,17H,1,7-8,11H2,2-5H3,(H,22,25)/t17-/m1/s1; Key:QQPVWGDNYWFMDE-QGZVFWFLSA-N

MDMB-5'Br-4en-PINACA is an indazole-3-carboxamide based synthetic cannabinoid receptor agonist that has been sold as a designer drug. It was first identified in Germany in November 2024. It is believed to be synthesized from the "half finished" synthesis precursor MDMB-5Br-INACA, which is shipped to the destination and then the final synthetic step is completed on arrival.

== See also ==
- 4F-MDMB-BINACA
- 5F-ADB
- ADB-5'Br-BUTINACA
- ADB-5'Br-PINACA
- MDMB-5'Br-BUTINACA
- MDMB-FUBINACA
