= C18H26N4O2 =

The molecular formula C_{18}H_{26}N_{4}O_{2} (molar mass: 330.43 g/mol) may refer to:

- AB-PINACA
- ADB-BUTINACA
