= ADB-HEXINACA =

Chemical compound

Legal status
- Legal status: CA: Schedule II; DE: NpSG (Industrial and scientific use only); UK: Class B; US: Schedule I

Identifiers
- IUPAC name: N-[(2S)-1-amino-3,3-dimethyl-1-oxobutan-2-yl]-1-hexyl-1H-indazole-3-carboxamide
- CAS Number: 3047777-38-5
- PubChem CID: 163191674
- ChemSpider: 109107958
- CompTox Dashboard (EPA): DTXSID701038279

Chemical and physical data
- Formula: C_{20}H_{30}N_{4}O_{2}
- Molar mass: 358.486 g·mol^{−1}
- 3D model (JSmol): Interactive image
- SMILES: O=C(N[C@@H](C(C)(C)C)C(N)=O)C1=NN(CCCCCC)C2=C1C=CC=C2
- InChI: InChI=1S/C20H30N4O2/c1-5-6-7-10-13-24-15-12-9-8-11-14(15)16(23-24)19(26)22-17(18(21)25)20(2,3)4/h8-9,11-12,17H,5-7,10,13H2,1-4H3,(H2,21,25)(H,22,26)/t17-/m1/s1; Key:PZMLDAGKYPJWHJ-QGZVFWFLSA-N

ADB-HEXINACA (also known as ADB-HINACA and ADMB-HEXINACA) is a cannabinoid designer drug that has been found as an ingredient in some synthetic cannabis products, first appearing in early 2021. It is a longer chain homologue of previously encountered synthetic cannabinoid compounds such as ADB-BUTINACA and ADB-PINACA. The pharmacology of ADB-HEXINACA and numerous analogues at CB1 and CB2 receptors has been reported.

== See also ==
- 4F-ADB
- 5F-ADB-PINACA
- ADB-CHMINACA
- ADB-FUBINACA
- ADB-4en-PINACA
- JWH-019
