= MDMB-BINACA =

Chemical compound

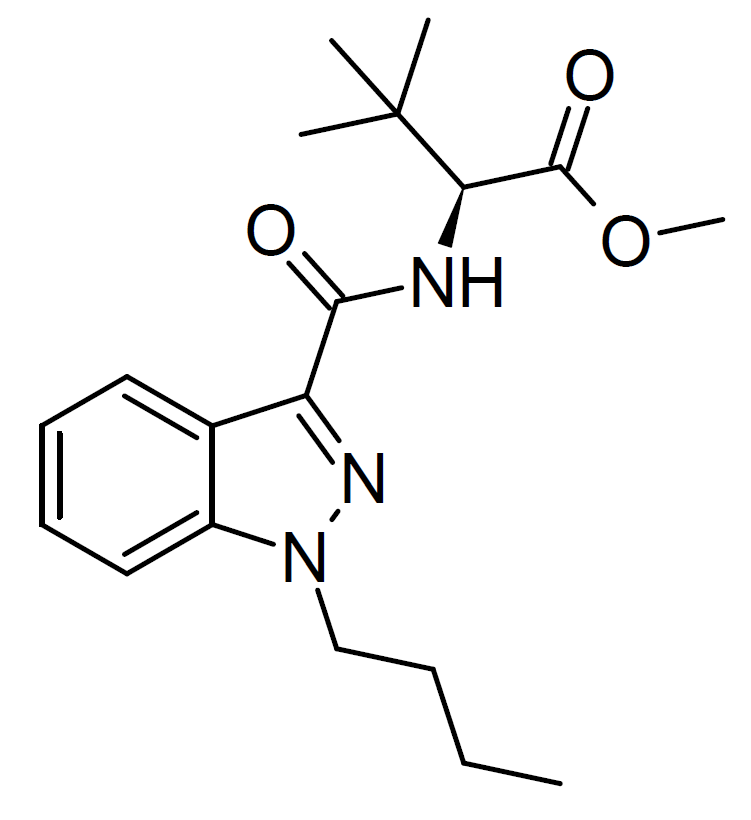

Identifiers
- IUPAC name: methyl (2S)-2-[(1-butylindazole-3-carbonyl)amino]-3,3-dimethylbutanoate
- PubChem CID: 165361538
- ChemSpider: 79413388
- UNII: AN7ERQ8YHM

Chemical and physical data
- Formula: C_{19}H_{27}N_{3}O_{3}
- Molar mass: 345.443 g·mol^{−1}
- 3D model (JSmol): Interactive image
- SMILES: CCCCN1C2=CC=CC=C2C(=N1)C(=O)N[C@H](C(=O)OC)C(C)(C)C
- InChI: InChI=1S/C19H27N3O3/c1-6-7-12-22-14-11-9-8-10-13(14)15(21-22)17(23)20-16(18(24)25-5)19(2,3)4/h8-11,16H,6-7,12H2,1-5H3,(H,20,23)/t16-/m1/s1; Key:YHAWFWPNIXPRDT-MRXNPFEDSA-N

MDMB-BINACA (MDMB-BUTINACA) is an indazole-3-carboxamide based synthetic cannabinoid receptor agonist that has been sold as a designer drug, first identified in Sweden in May 2023. It has a similar chemical structure to potent cannabinoid agonists previously reported such as ADB-BUTINACA and MDMB-5'Br-BUTINACA, and is believed to have similar effects.

== See also ==
- 4F-MDMB-BINACA
- ADB-5'F-BUTINACA
- ADB-5'Br-BUTINACA
- JWH-073
