= MDMB-5Br-INACA =

Chemical compound

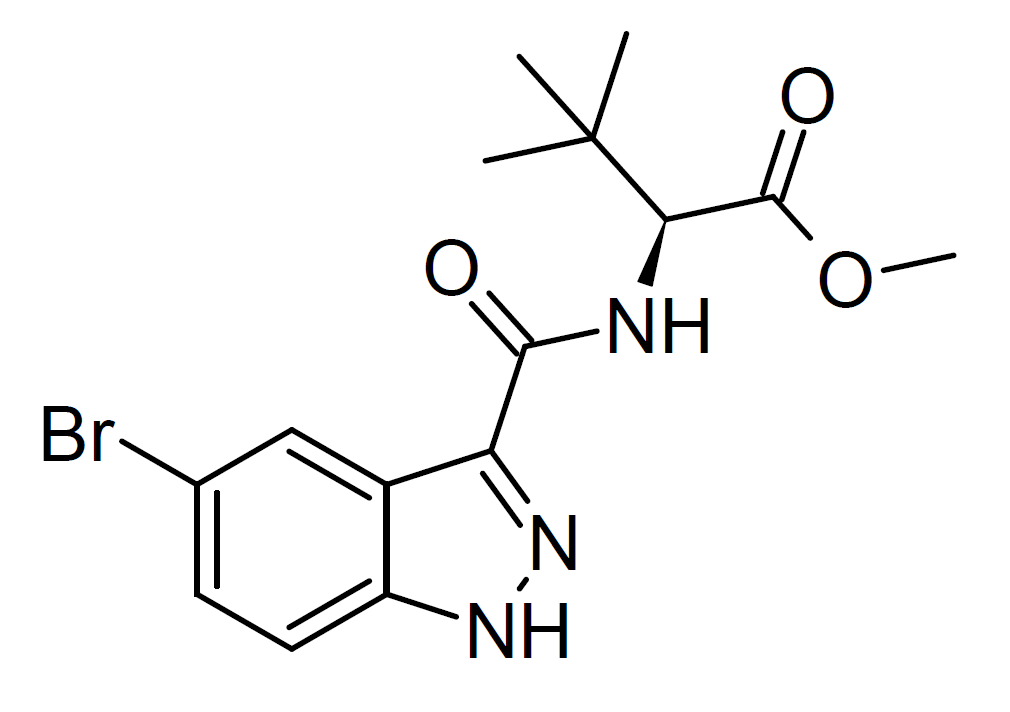

Legal status
- Legal status: BR: Class F2 (Prohibited psychotropics)

Identifiers
- IUPAC name: methyl (2S)-2-[(5-bromo-1H-indazole-3-carbonyl)amino]-3,3-dimethylbutanoate
- PubChem CID: 165362085
- ChemSpider: 114952001
- UNII: 2Q2FVJ9CFN
- CompTox Dashboard (EPA): DTXSID701345242

Chemical and physical data
- Formula: C_{15}H_{18}BrN_{3}O_{3}
- Molar mass: 368.231 g·mol^{−1}
- 3D model (JSmol): Interactive image
- SMILES: O=C(OC)[C@@H](NC(=O)c1n[NH]c2ccc(Br)cc21)C(C)(C)C
- InChI: InChI=1S/C15H18BrN3O3/c1-15(2,3)12(14(21)22-4)17-13(20)11-9-7-8(16)5-6-10(9)18-19-11/h5-7,12H,1-4H3,(H,17,20)(H,18,19)/t12-/m1/s1; Key:QGEVEXPJOKFMAN-GFCCVEGCSA-N

MDMB-5Br-INACA is an indazole-3-carboxamide derivative which has been sold as a designer drug. Surprisingly it has been reported to produce psychoactive activity despite the lack of a "tail" group at the indazole 1-position, but is likely of relatively low potency as a CB1 agonist and has been encountered being misrepresented as other illicit drugs such as MDMA.

This reported psychoactive activity has been limitedly reported on but could be related to activity beyond the cannabinoid receptors due to vague structural relation to compounds like 1Z2MAP1O and α-Methylisotryptamine.

== Use as a precursor ==
MDMB-5Br-INACA is believed to be used as a precursor in the synthesis of synthetic cannabinoids. It has been sold online as a "chemistry kit" with other compounds required to complete the reaction. This reaction would complete MDMB-5Br-INACA by giving it a "tail" group required for high cannabinoid activity. Other precursors lacking a tail chain have also been marketed such as (ADB-5-Br-INACA), (CH-IATA), (ADB-IACA), and (ADB-5’Br-EZO-CA). This may be due to increasing legality changes worldwide on synthetic cannabinoids.

== Legality ==
In the United States, MDMB-5Br-INACA is unscheduled at the federal level as of May 22nd, 2023.

North Dakota has placed MDMB-5Br-INACA (along with ADB-5'Br-BINACA, ADB-5'Br-BUTINACA and ADB-5-Br-INACA) into Schedule I on 04/27/2023.

== See also ==
- 4F-MDMB-BINACA
- 5F-ADB
- ADB-5'Br-PINACA
- MDMB-FUBINACA
- MDMB-5'Br-BUTINACA
