= ADB-4en-PINACA =

Chemical compound

Legal status
- Legal status: CA: Schedule II; DE: NpSG (Industrial and scientific use only); UK: Class B; US: Schedule I

Identifiers
- IUPAC name: N-[(2S)-1-amino-3,3-dimethyl-1-oxobutan-2-yl]-1-(pent-4-en-1-yl)-1H-indazole-3-carboxamide
- CAS Number: 2659308-44-6
- PubChem CID: 162705324
- ChemSpider: 103835283
- UNII: 76QQ7SDU32
- CompTox Dashboard (EPA): DTXSID601038864

Chemical and physical data
- Formula: C_{19}H_{26}N_{4}O_{2}
- Molar mass: 342.443 g·mol^{−1}
- 3D model (JSmol): Interactive image
- SMILES: NC(=O)[C@@H](NC(=O)c1nn(CCCC=C)c2ccccc21)C(C)(C)C
- InChI: InChI=1S/C19H26N4O2/c1-5-6-9-12-23-14-11-8-7-10-13(14)15(22-23)18(25)21-16(17(20)24)19(2,3)4/h5,7-8,10-11,16H,1,6,9,12H2,2-4H3,(H2,20,24)(H,21,25); Key:NXDLAZXBALPFSN-UHFFFAOYSA-N

ADB-4en-PINACA is a cannabinoid designer drug that has been found as an ingredient in some synthetic cannabis products, first appearing in early 2021. It is a reasonably potent cannabinoid agonist in vitro but has not been so widely sold as related compounds such as ADB-PINACA and MDMB-4en-PINACA.

== Legality ==
In the United States, the DEA has temporarily placed ADB-4en-PINACA into Schedule I status starting on December 12, 2023, for up to 2 years, during which it's possible the DEA could file for permanent scheduling within those 2 years. If the DEA does not file to permanent placement the temporary Schedule I order will expire on December 12, 2025.

== See also ==
- 5F-ADB-PINACA
- ADB-BINACA
- ADB-CHMINACA
- ADB-FUBINACA
- ADB-HEXINACA
