= C12H16N2O3 =

Molecular formula

The molecular formula C_{12}H_{16}N_{2}O_{3} (molar mass: 236.27 g/mol) may refer to:

- Cyclobarbital
- Hexobarbital
