= MDMB-4en-PINACA =

Chemical compound

Legal status
- Legal status: BR: Class F2 (Prohibited psychotropics); CA: Schedule II; DE: Anlage II (Authorized trade only, not prescriptible); UK: Class B; US: Schedule I

Identifiers
- IUPAC name: methyl (S)-3,3-dimethyl-2-(1-(pent-4-en-1-yl)-1H-indazole-3-carboxamido)butanoate
- CAS Number: 2504100-70-1
- PubChem CID: 155804661
- ChemSpider: 71117180
- UNII: K2DZN2TDD6
- KEGG: C22788

Chemical and physical data
- Formula: C_{20}H_{27}N_{3}O_{3}
- Molar mass: 357.454 g·mol^{−1}
- 3D model (JSmol): Interactive image
- SMILES: O=C(N[C@@H](C(C)(C)C)C(OC)=O)C1=NN(CCCC=C)C2=C1C=CC=C2
- InChI: InChI=1S/C20H27N3O3/c1-6-7-10-13-23-15-12-9-8-11-14(15)16(22-23)18(24)21-17(19(25)26-5)20(2,3)4/h6,8-9,11-12,17H,1,7,10,13H2,2-5H3,(H,21,24)/t17-/m1/s1; Key:LWOCBHBFWNGPGM-QGZVFWFLSA-N

MDMB-4en-PINACA (also incorrectly known as 5-CL-ADB-A) is an indazole-based synthetic cannabinoid that has been sold online as a designer drug. MDMB-4en-PINACA was first identified in Europe in 2017. In 2021, MDMB-4en-PINACA was the most common synthetic cannabinoid identified by the Drug Enforcement Administration in the United States. MDMB-4en-PINACA differs from 5F-MDMB-PINACA due to replacement of 5-fluoropentyl with a pent-4-ene moiety (4-en).

== Etymology ==
MDMB-4en-PINACA partially follows the cannabinoid naming scheme of LinkedGroup–TailChain–Core–Linker, where:

- MDMB stands for Methyl DiMethyl Butanoate, the linked group.
- 4en stands for 4-en-1-yl, part of the carbon chain.
- PINACA stands for Pentyl-1H-INdAzole-3-CarboxAmide, the core group and linker.

== Pharmacology ==
It acts as a potent agonist of the CB_{1} receptor with an EC_{50} value of 2.47 nM. MDMB-4en-PINACA has been reported to be approximately 2.5x to 3x+ (2.47 nM, 239%) stronger (by CB1 activated β-arrestin 2 recruitment) than JWH-018 (25.3 nM, 100%) with over 10x the binding affinity than JWH-018 in vitro.

In a review of in vitro MDMB-4en-PINACA studies showed an EC50 of 1.88–2.47 nM, an Emax of 221–299% (compared to JWH-018), and a Ki value of 0.28nM on the CB1 receptor and appears to be 7x more selective for the CB2 receptor over the CB1 receptor. MDMB-4en-PINACA has an in vitro half-life of approximately 10 minutes but has been reported in human urine samples up to an hour after consumption, producing 14 metabolites which may have their own pharmacological activity and be used in identification of MDMB-4en-PINACA consumption.

== Toxicity and compositions ==
There have been more than 15 deaths associated with use of MDMB-4en-PINACA

MDMB-4en-PINACA has been implicated in the death of a 26 year old in combination with 4F-ABUTINACA (N-(4-fluorobutyl) APINACA). The deceased reported headache and angina before death and was noted to have a weak pulse and death-rattle like noisy breathing after collapsing to the floor. An autopsy 5 days after death found a peripheral blood content of 7.2 ng/mL of MDMB-4en-PINACA and 9.1 ng/mL of 4F-ABUTINACA and identified brain edema, internal congestion, petechial bleeding, pleural ecchymoses, and blood fluidity.

MDMB-4en-PINACA has been implicated in the death of a 35 year old. An autopsy found MDMB-4en-PINACA and one of its metabolites (MDMB-4en-PINACA 3,3-dimethylbutanoic acid) in peripheral blood at a level of 0.4 μg/L and 5.7 μg/L and 0.5 μg/L and 11.6 μg/L in cardiac blood. Urine contained 2.1 μg/L for the metabolite, and a detection below level of quantification for MDMB-4en-PINACA itself.

Adulterated Cannabis products in Europe that have been laced with MDMB-4en-PINACA have contained 0.3 to 4.6 μg/mg in seized flower samples and 1.7 to 7.2 μg/mg in hash/or other extract samples.

Adulterated Cannabis products in Italy that have been laced with MDMB-4en-PINACA have contained 0.4 up to 6.3 mg/g

MDMB-4en-PINACA has been detected in heroin and fentanyl sold on the streets in Massachusetts.

MDMB-4en-PINACA powder can range in color from white or yellow or brown or orange.

The methyl 3,3-dimethylbutanoate "head" moiety of MDMB-4en-PINACA has been implicated in higher CB1 potency but also toxicity compared to other "head" moiety groups such as the naphthene "head" moiety of JWH-018 and AM-2201 and the 2,2,3,3-tetramethylcyclopropyl (or 3-tetramethylcyclopropylmethanone) "head" moiety of UR-144 and XLR-11

== Legal status ==
Sweden's public health agency suggested classifying MDMB-4en-PINACA as a hazardous substance, on December 18, 2019.

In the United States, the DEA has temporarily placed MDMB-4en-PINACA into Schedule I status starting on December 12, 2023, for up to 2 years, during which it's possible the DEA could file for permanent scheduling within those 2 years. If the DEA does not file to permanent placement the temporary Schedule I order will expire on December 12, 2025.

North Dakota has placed MDMB-4en-PINACA into Schedule I on 04/27/2023.

Virginia has placed MDMB-4en-PINACA into Schedule I.

In England and Wales, the drug is classified as a Class B drug under the provisions of the Misuse Of Drugs Act 1971 ( Statutory Instrument 2019 No 1323).

== See also ==
- ADB-PINACA
- ADB-4en-PINACA
- MDMB-5'Br-4en-PINACA
- MDMB-CHMICA
- MDMB-CHMINACA
- MDMB-FUBINACA
- MMB-4en-PICA
