= ADB-5'Br-BUTINACA =

Chemical compound

Identifiers
- IUPAC name: N-[(2S)-1-amino-3,3-dimethyl-1-oxobutan-2-yl]-5-bromo-1-butylindazole-3-carboxamide
- PubChem CID: 168322646
- ChemSpider: 115005697

Chemical and physical data
- Formula: C_{18}H_{25}BrN_{4}O_{2}
- Molar mass: 409.328 g·mol^{−1}
- 3D model (JSmol): Interactive image
- SMILES: NC(=O)[C@@H](NC(=O)c1nn(CCCC)c2ccc(Br)cc21)C(C)(C)C
- InChI: InChI=1S/C18H25BrN4O2/c1-5-6-9-23-13-8-7-11(19)10-12(13)14(22-23)17(25)21-15(16(20)24)18(2,3)4/h7-8,10,15H,5-6,9H2,1-4H3,(H2,20,24)(H,21,25)/t15-/m1/s1; Key:DIOILIVJIIJFPO-OAHLLOKOSA-N

ADB-5'Br-BUTINACA (ADB-B-5Br-INACA) is an indazole-3-carboxamide based synthetic cannabinoid receptor agonist which has been sold as a designer drug, first detected in Philadelphia in the US in May 2022, and subsequently found in South Korea, Portugal and Sweden. It is specifically listed as an illegal drug in Italy, South Korea and several states in the US, and controlled under analogue legislation in various other jurisdictions.

== See also ==
- ADB-BUTINACA
- ADB-5'Br-PINACA
- ADB-5'F-BUTINACA
- ADSB-FUB-187
- MDMB-5'Br-BUTINACA
- MDMB-BINACA
