= Psychotropic Substances Act (United States) =

1978 drug control treaty compliance law

- Long title: An Act to amend the Comprehensive Drug Abuse Prevention and Control Act of 1970 and other laws to meet obligations under the Convention on Psychotropic Substances relating to regulatory controls on the manufacture, distribution, importation, and exportation of psychotropic substances, and for other purposes.
- Acronyms (colloquial): PSA
- Nicknames: Psychotropic Substances Act of 1978
- Enacted by: the 95th United States Congress
- Effective: November 10, 1978

Citations
- Public law: 95-633
- Statutes at Large: 92 Stat. 3768

Codification
- Titles amended: 21 U.S.C.: Food and Drugs
- U.S.C. sections amended: 21 U.S.C. ch. 13, subch. I § 801 et seq.

Legislative history
- Introduced in the Senate as S. 2399 by John Culver (D–IA) on January 20, 1978; Committee consideration by Senate Judiciary; Passed the Senate on July 27, 1978 (passed); Passed the House on September 18, 1978 (passed, in lieu of H.R. 12008) with amendment; Senate agreed to House amendment on October 7, 1978 (agreed) with further amendment; House agreed to Senate amendment on October 13, 1978 (agreed); Signed into law by President Jimmy Carter on November 10, 1978

The Psychotropic Substances Act of 1978 amended the Comprehensive Drug Abuse Prevention and Control Act of 1970 and Controlled Substances Act to ensure compliance with the Convention on Psychotropic Substances. 21 U.S.C. § 801a notes, "It is the intent of the Congress that the amendments made by this Act, together with existing law, will enable the United States to meet all of its obligations under the Convention and that no further legislation will be necessary for that purpose." The Psychotropic Substances Act created mechanisms by which the U.S. Government would add substances to the Schedules of controlled substances as required by the Convention. It also established a framework for exercising the U.S.'s rights to influence drug scheduling at the international level. The Secretary of Health and Human Services was given the power to make scheduling recommendations that would be binding on the U.S. representative in discussions and negotiations related to drug scheduling proposals before the Commission on Narcotic Drugs.

The Act viewed the regulations of Schedules IV and V of the Controlled Substances Act as being adequate to fulfill the minimum treaty obligations in the event of a disagreement between the U.S. and the U.N. on drug scheduling.

The S. 2399 legislation was passed by the 95th U.S. Congressional session and enacted into law by the 39th President of the United States Jimmy Carter on November 10, 1978.
