= Bulletin on Narcotics =

The Bulletin on Narcotics is a publication of the United Nations Office on Drugs and Crime. First published in 1981, the bulletin provides a great deal of insight into the legislative history of the drug control treaties of the 20th century, including the earlier treaties as well as:

- The 1961 Single Convention on Narcotic Drugs
- The 1971 Convention on Psychotropic Substances
- The 1988 United Nations Convention Against Illicit Traffic in Narcotic Drugs and Psychotropic Substances.
