= MDMB-5'Br-BUTINACA =

Chemical compound

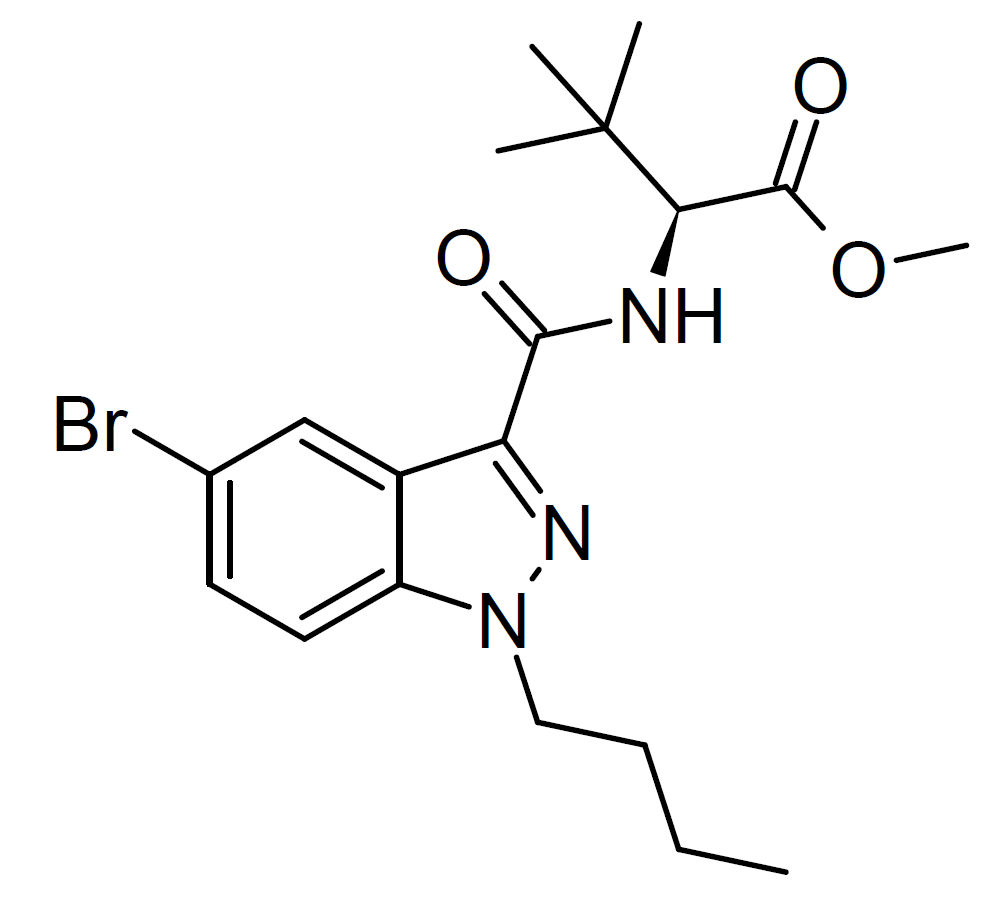

Identifiers
- IUPAC name: methyl (2S)-2-[(5-bromo-1-butylindazole-3-carbonyl)amino]-3,3-dimethylbutanoate
- CAS Number: 1185888-28-1
- PubChem CID: 168325141
- ChemSpider: 115285275

Chemical and physical data
- Formula: C_{19}H_{26}BrN_{3}O_{3}
- Molar mass: 424.339 g·mol^{−1}
- 3D model (JSmol): Interactive image
- SMILES: CCCCN1C2=C(C=C(C=C2)Br)C(=N1)C(=O)N[C@H](C(=O)OC)C(C)(C)C
- InChI: InChI=1S/C19H26BrN3O3/c1-6-7-10-23-14-9-8-12(20)11-13(14)15(22-23)17(24)21-16(18(25)26-5)19(2,3)4/h8-9,11,16H,6-7,10H2,1-5H3,(H,21,24)/t16-/m1/s1; Key:NKCFVJNTALOWGJ-MRXNPFEDSA-N

MDMB-5'Br-BUTINACA (5'-Br-MDMB-BUTINACA) is an indazole-3-carboxamide based synthetic cannabinoid receptor agonist that has been sold as a designer drug. It was first identified in Russia in August 2022. It is believed to be synthesized from the "half finished" synthesis precursor MDMB-5Br-INACA, which is shipped to the destination and then the final synthetic step is completed on arrival.

== See also ==
- 4F-MDMB-BINACA
- 6-Bromopravadoline
- ADB-PINACA
- ADB-5'F-BUTINACA
- ADB-5'Br-BUTINACA
- ADB-5'Br-PINACA
- ADSB-FUB-187
- MDMB-BINACA
- MDMB-5'Br-4en-PINACA
