= Cyclobarbital =

Barbiturate

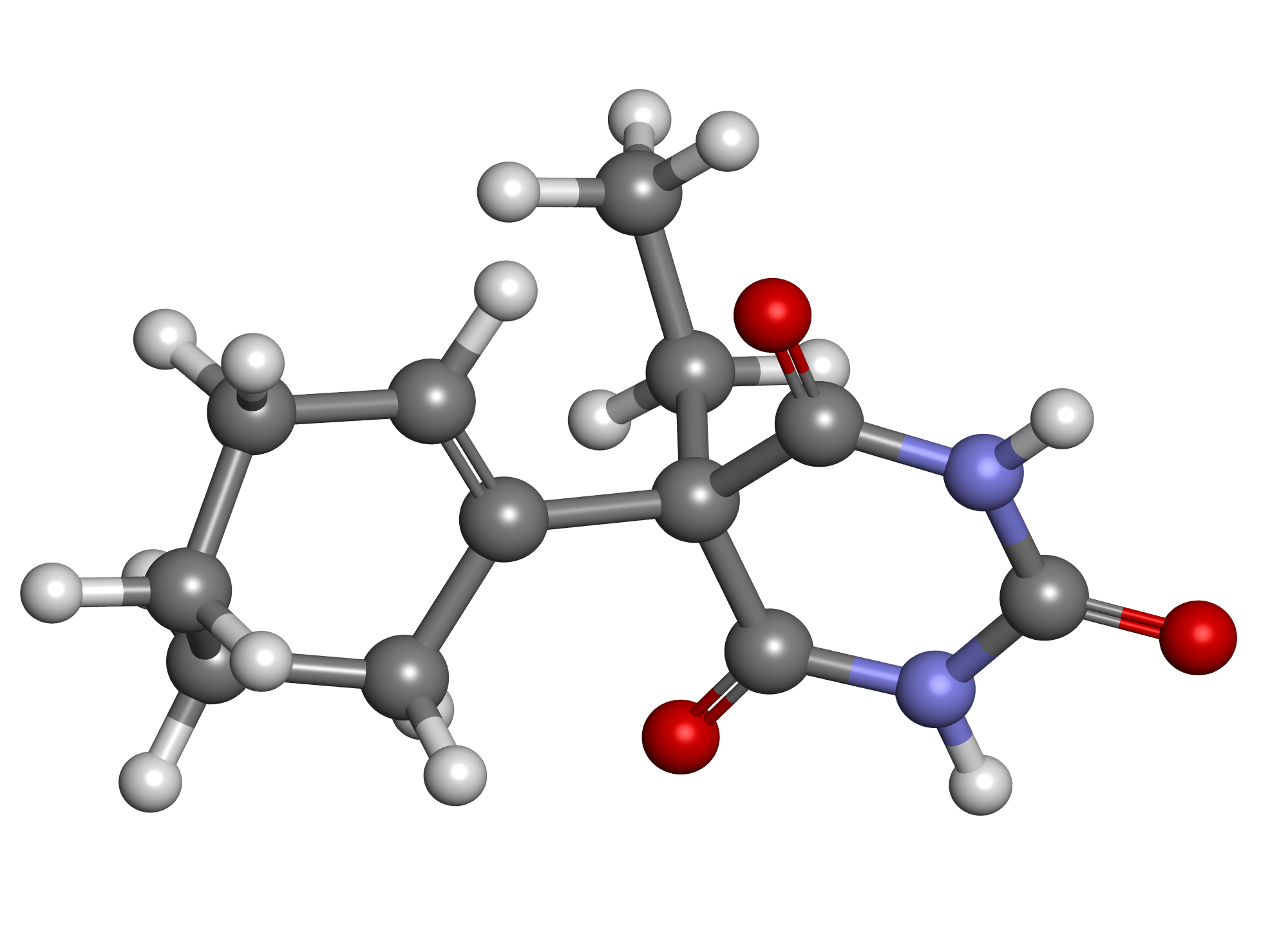

Clinical data
- AHFS/Drugs.com: International Drug Names
- Routes of administration: Oral (tablets)
- ATC code: N05CA10 (WHO)

Legal status
- Legal status: BR: Class B1 (Psychoactive drugs); CA: Schedule IV; DE: Anlage II (Authorized trade only, not prescriptible); UK: Class B; UN: Psychotropic Schedule III

Pharmacokinetic data
- Metabolism: Hepatic
- Excretion: Renal

Identifiers
- IUPAC name: 5-(1-cyclohexenyl)-5-ethyl-1,3-diazinane-2,4,6-trione
- CAS Number: 52-31-3; calcium: 143-76-0
- PubChem CID: 5838
- ChemSpider: 5632
- UNII: 0M8A98AD9H; calcium: 0HZN7FV25R
- KEGG: D07323
- ChEMBL: ChEMBL268164
- CompTox Dashboard (EPA): DTXSID9022865
- ECHA InfoCard: 100.000.127

Chemical and physical data
- Formula: C_{12}H_{16}N_{2}O_{3}
- Molar mass: 236.271 g·mol^{−1}
- 3D model (JSmol): Interactive image
- SMILES: O=C1NC(=O)NC(=O)C1(/C2=C/CCCC2)CC
- InChI: InChI=1S/C12H16N2O3/c1-2-12(8-6-4-3-5-7-8)9(15)13-11(17)14-10(12)16/h6H,2-5,7H2,1H3,(H2,13,14,15,16,17); Key:WTYGAUXICFETTC-UHFFFAOYSA-N

Cyclobarbital, cyclobarbitol or cyclobarbitone (brand name Phanodorm) is a barbiturate derivative developed in the early 1920s in Germany.

It was available in Russia until 2019, marketed and distributed as Reladorm, a fixed-dose combination pairing 100 mg cyclobarbital and 10 mg diazepam (a benzodiazepine anxiolytic, muscle relaxant, and anticonvulsant) indicated for treating insomnia before it was discontinued in 2019.
