= ADB-BUTINACA =

Chemical compound

Legal status
- Legal status: BR: Class F2 (Prohibited psychotropics); CA: Schedule II; DE: BtMG Anlage II; UK: Class B; US: Schedule I; UN: Psychotropic Schedule II

Identifiers
- IUPAC name: N-[(2S)-1-amino-3,3-dimethyl-1-oxobutan-2-yl]-1-butyl-1H-indazole-3-carboxamide
- CAS Number: 2682867-55-4
- PubChem CID: 155907792
- ChemSpider: 81407832
- UNII: ZJ6LS4NVM9
- ChEMBL: ChEMBL5169682
- CompTox Dashboard (EPA): DTXSID501342361

Chemical and physical data
- Formula: C_{18}H_{26}N_{4}O_{2}
- Molar mass: 330.432 g·mol^{−1}
- 3D model (JSmol): Interactive image
- SMILES: O=C(N[C@H](C(N)=O)C(C)(C)C)C1=NN(CCCC)C2=C1C=CC=C2
- InChI: InChI=1S/C18H26N4O2/c1-5-6-11-22-13-10-8-7-9-12(13)14(21-22)17(24)20-15(16(19)23)18(2,3)4/h7-10,15H,5-6,11H2,1-4H3,(H2,19,23)(H,20,24)/t15-/m1/s1; Key:GPWADXHYJAZPAX-OAHLLOKOSA-N

ADB-BUTINACA (also known as ADMB-BINACA using EMCDDA naming standards) is a synthetic cannabinoid compound which has been sold as a designer drug. It is a potent CB_{1} agonist, with a binding affinity of 0.29nM for CB1 and 0.91nM for CB2, and an EC_{50} of 6.36 nM for CB1.

== See also ==
- ADB-BINACA
- ADB-PINACA
- ADB-HEXINACA
- ADB-5'F-BUTINACA
- ADB-5'Br-BUTINACA
- MDMB-BINACA
