= 5F-MDMB-PICA =

Chemical compound

Clinical data
- Other names: 5F-MDMB-2201; 5-Fluoro MDMB-PICA

Legal status
- Legal status: BR: Class F2 (Prohibited psychotropics); CA: Schedule II; DE: Anlage II (Authorized trade only, not prescriptible); UK: Class B; US: Schedule I; UN: Psychotropic Schedule II

Identifiers
- IUPAC name: Methyl (2S)-2-[[1-(5-fluoropentyl)indole-3-carbonyl]amino]-3,3-dimethylbutanoate
- CAS Number: 1971007-88-1
- PubChem CID: 129597835
- ChemSpider: 68003951
- UNII: NG3U6O970A
- KEGG: C22803

Chemical and physical data
- Formula: C_{21}H_{29}FN_{2}O_{3}
- Molar mass: 376.472 g·mol^{−1}
- 3D model (JSmol): Interactive image
- SMILES: O=C(N[C@H](C(OC)=O)C(C)(C)C)C1=CN(CCCCCF)C2=C1C=CC=C2
- InChI: InChI=1S/C21H29FN2O3/c1-21(2,3)18(20(26)27-4)23-19(25)16-14-24(13-9-5-8-12-22)17-11-7-6-10-15(16)17/h6-7,10-11,14,18H,5,8-9,12-13H2,1-4H3,(H,23,25)/t18-/m1/s1; Key:CHSUEEBESACQDV-GOSISDBHSA-N

5F-MDMB-PICA (MDMB-5F-PICA) is a designer drug and synthetic cannabinoid. In 2018, it was the fifth-most common synthetic cannabinoid identified in drugs seized by the Drug Enforcement Administration.

5F-MDMB-PICA is a potent agonist of both the CB_{1} receptor and the CB_{2} receptor with EC_{50} values of 0.45 nM and 7.4 nM, respectively.

In the United States, 5F-MDMB-PICA was temporarily emergency scheduled by the DEA in 2019. In December 2019, the UNODC announced scheduling recommendations placing 5F-MDMB-PICA into Schedule II. In the United States 5F-MDMB-PICA was made a permanent Schedule I Controlled Substance nationwide on April 7, 2022.
