= ADSB-FUB-187 =

Synthetic cannabinoid

Legal status
- Legal status: CA: Schedule II; DE: NpSG (Industrial and scientific use only); UK: Under Psychoactive Substances Act

Identifiers
- IUPAC name: 7-chloro-N-[(2S)-1-[2-(cyclopropylsulfonylamino)ethylamino]-3,3-dimethyl-1-oxobutan-2-yl]-1-[(4-fluorophenyl)methyl]indazole-3-carboxamide
- CAS Number: 1185283-97-9
- PubChem CID: 44186812
- ChemSpider: 65322246
- UNII: L6K9PBL5EO
- CompTox Dashboard (EPA): DTXSID701032540

Chemical and physical data
- Formula: C_{26}H_{31}ClFN_{5}O_{4}S
- Molar mass: 564.07 g·mol^{−1}
- 3D model (JSmol): Interactive image
- SMILES: CC(C)(C)[C@@H](C(=O)NCCNS(=O)(=O)C1CC1)NC(=O)C2=NN(C3=C2C=CC=C3Cl)CC4=CC=C(C=C4)F
- InChI: InChI=1S/C26H31ClFN5O4S/c1-26(2,3)23(25(35)29-13-14-30-38(36,37)18-11-12-18)31-24(34)21-19-5-4-6-20(27)22(19)33(32-21)15-16-7-9-17(28)10-8-16/h4-10,18,23,30H,11-15H2,1-3H3,(H,29,35)(H,31,34)/t23-/m1/s1; Key:UANJTRHQSBHCID-HSZRJFAPSA-N

ADSB-FUB-187 is an indazole-based synthetic cannabinoid. It is a potent agonist of the CB_{1} receptor with a binding affinity of K_{i} = 0.09 nM and an EC_{50} of 1.09 nM. It was originally developed by Pfizer in 2009, being example 187 from patent WO 2009/106982. While it is the most tightly binding compound from this patent in terms of K_{i}, it is not the most potent compound at producing a CB_{1} mediated pharmacological effect, with at least 17 other compounds from the patent having lower EC_{50} values.

== Legality ==
Sweden's public health agency suggested classifying ADSB-FUB-187 as hazardous substance on November 10, 2014, following its use as an ingredient in grey-market synthetic cannabis products.

== See also ==
- AB-FUBINACA
- ADB-FUBINACA
- ADB-5'F-BUTINACA
- ADB-5'Br-PINACA
- MDMB-5'Br-BUTINACA
