= ADB-5'F-BUTINACA =

Chemical compound

Identifiers
- IUPAC name: N-(1-amino-3,3-dimethyl-1-oxo-2-butanyl)-1-butyl-1H-5-fluoroindazole-3-carboxamide
- PubChem CID: 172871959
- ChemSpider: 129395451

Chemical and physical data
- Formula: C_{18}H_{25}FN_{4}O_{2}
- Molar mass: 348.422 g·mol^{−1}
- 3D model (JSmol): Interactive image
- SMILES: O=C(N[C@H](C(N)=O)C(C)(C)C)C1=NN(CCCC)C2=C1C=C(F)C=C2
- InChI: InChI=1S/C18H25FN4O2/c1-5-6-9-23-13-8-7-11(19)10-12(13)14(22-23)17(25)21-15(16(20)24)18(2,3)4/h7-8,10,15H,5-6,9H2,1-4H3,(H2,20,24)(H,21,25)/t15-/m1/s1; Key:JORGRORAECYNOJ-OAHLLOKOSA-N

ADB-5'F-BUTINACA is an indazole-3-carboxamide based synthetic cannabinoid receptor agonist. It was synthesised as part of investigations into related compounds such as ADB-5'Br-BUTINACA and MDMB-5'Br-BUTINACA, and confirmed that fluorination of the indazole 5-position increases potency in a similar manner to bromination.

== See also ==
- ADB-BUTINACA
- ADB-5'Br-PINACA
- ADSB-FUB-187
