= Gabriel G. Nahas =

Anesthesiologist and drug researcher

Gabriel Georges Nahas (March 4, 1920 – June 28, 2012) was an anesthesiologist known for his advocacy against marijuana use and for the illegality of drugs. He worked at Walter Reed Medical Center Columbia University and later New York University.

His mother Gabrielle Wolff Nahas, was French, and his father Bishara Nahas (1887-1929), was a Lebanese agricultural engineer and merchant who emigrated to the United States and then gained recognition for his timely book on King Tut-ankh-amun. The Nahas family moved from Gabriel's birthplace of Alexandria, Egypt to southern France when he was a child. An active member of the French Resistance, he was awarded the Légion d'honneur by Charles de Gaulle, the croix de guerre with three palm leaves and a star, the Medal of Freedom from US President Harry S. Truman, Ellis Island Medal of Honor from US President Ronald Reagan, was a Fulbright scholar, member of the Order of the British Empire (OBE), officer of the order of Orange-NASSAU, Medal of Honor of the Statue of Liberty, and Ph.D. from the University of Minnesota where he was a Mayo Foundation Fellow. On June 3, 1988 Nahas received an honorary doctorate from the Faculty of Medicine at Uppsala University, Sweden While at Walter Reed, his research on intra-operative acid base balance spurred a new protocol of patient management in the operating room. Nahas also argued against the use of cocaine for experimental purposes in human subjects.

After moving to Columbia University, his work on addiction and the health risks of controlled substances brought him fame as well as considerable opprobrium. He died in Manhattan in 2012 of a respiratory infection.
