= MDMB-CHMINACA =

Chemical compound

Legal status
- Legal status: CA: Schedule II; DE: NpSG (Industrial and scientific use only); UK: Class B; Illegal in Singapore and Switzerland

Identifiers
- IUPAC name: Methyl (2S)-2-{[1-(cyclohexylmethyl)-1H-indazol-3-yl]formamido}-3,3-dimethylbutanoate
- CAS Number: 1185888-32-7
- PubChem CID: 121491808
- ChemSpider: 32055574
- UNII: Z6EXBVG316
- CompTox Dashboard (EPA): DTXSID001010034

Chemical and physical data
- Formula: C_{22}H_{31}N_{3}O_{3}
- Molar mass: 385.508 g·mol^{−1}
- 3D model (JSmol): Interactive image
- SMILES: CC(C)(C)[C@@H](C(=O)OC)NC(=O)C1=NN(C2=CC=CC=C21)CC3CCCCC3
- InChI: InChI=1S/C22H31N3O3/c1-22(2,3)19(21(27)28-4)23-20(26)18-16-12-8-9-13-17(16)25(24-18)14-15-10-6-5-7-11-15/h8-9,12-13,15,19H,5-7,10-11,14H2,1-4H3,(H,23,26)/t19-/m1/s1; Key:DGQMLBSSRFFINY-LJQANCHMSA-N

MDMB-CHMINACA (also known as MDMB(N)-CHM) is an indazole-based synthetic cannabinoid that acts as a potent agonist of the CB_{1} receptor, and has been sold online as a designer drug. It was invented by Pfizer in 2008, and is one of the most potent cannabinoid agonists known, with a binding affinity of 0.0944 nM at CB_{1}, and an EC_{50} of 0.330 nM. It is closely related to MDMB-FUBINACA, which caused at least 1000 hospitalizations and 40 deaths in Russia as consequence of intoxication.

== Legal status ==
MDMB-CHMINACA is a Fifth Schedule of the Misuse of Drugs Act (MDA) controlled substance in Singapore as of May 2015.

MDMB-CHMINACA is illegal in Germany, Switzerland as of December 2015.

Sweden's public health agency suggested classifying MDMB-CHMINACA as a hazardous substance, on September 25, 2019.

== See also ==
- AB-CHMINACA
- ADB-CHMINACA
- ADB-FUBINACA
- MDMB-CHMICA
- MDMB-FUBINACA
- PX-3 (APP-CHMINACA)
