= ADB-5'Br-PINACA =

Synthetic cannabinoid, designer drug

Legal status
- Legal status: DE: NpSG (Industrial and scientific use only); UK: Class B

Identifiers
- IUPAC name: N-(1-Amino-3,3-dimethyl-1-oxo-2-butanyl)-1-pentyl-1H-5-bromoindazole-3-carboxamide
- PubChem CID: 168310461
- ChemSpider: 115285280

Chemical and physical data
- Formula: C_{19}H_{27}BrN_{4}O_{2}
- Molar mass: 423.355 g·mol^{−1}
- 3D model (JSmol): Interactive image
- SMILES: NC(=O)[C@@H](NC(=O)c1nn(CCCCC)c2ccc(Br)cc21)C(C)(C)C
- InChI: InChI=1S/C19H27BrN4O2/c1-5-6-7-10-24-14-9-8-12(20)11-13(14)15(23-24)18(26)22-16(17(21)25)19(2,3)4/h8-9,11,16H,5-7,10H2,1-4H3,(H2,21,25)(H,22,26)/t16-/m1/s1; Key:OUVRBTCXLMBRLT-MRXNPFEDSA-N

ADB-5'Br-PINACA (5'-Br-ADB-PINACA) is an indazole-3-carboxamide based synthetic cannabinoid receptor agonist that has been sold as a designer drug. It was first identified in Abu Dhabi in September 2022 but has subsequently been found in the US and Europe. While formal pharmacology studies have not yet been carried out, ADB-5'Br-PINACA is believed to be a highly potent synthetic cannabinoid with similar potency to compounds such as MDMB-FUBINACA and 5F-ADB, which have been responsible for numerous fatal and non-fatal drug overdoses, consistent with previously reported compounds from the patent literature showing bromination of the indazole ring at the 5-, 6-, or 7- positions to increase potency over the unsubstituted analogues. ADB-5'Br-PINACA is the 5'-bromo analog of ADB-PINACA.

== Synthesis ==
ADB-5'Br-PINACA can be synthesized from a "half finished" synthesis precursor known as ADB-5-Br-INACA, related to MDMB-5Br-INACA.

== Legality ==
ADB-5'Br-PINACA is not specifically scheduled in the United States at the federal level as of October 20, 2023 but may be considered illegal under the federal analogue act if intended for consumption as a structural analog of the Schedule I cannabinoid ADB-PINACA.

== See also ==
- 6-Bromopravadoline
- ADB-PINACA
- ADB-5'F-BUTINACA
- ADMB-3TMS-PRINACA
- ADSB-FUB-187
- MDMB-5'Br-INACA
- MDMB-5'Br-BUTINACA
