= 5F-ADB-PINACA =

Chemical compound

Legal status
- Legal status: CA: Schedule II; DE: NpSG (Industrial and scientific use only); UK: Class B

Identifiers
- IUPAC name: N-(1-Amino-3,3-dimethyl-1-oxobutan-2-yl)-1-(5-fluoropentyl)-1H-indazole-3-carboxamide
- CAS Number: 1863065-90-0
- PubChem CID: 119058050
- ChemSpider: 52085408
- UNII: LOL2KQM530
- CompTox Dashboard (EPA): DTXSID301016736

Chemical and physical data
- Formula: C_{19}H_{27}FN_{4}O_{2}
- Molar mass: 362.449 g·mol^{−1}
- 3D model (JSmol): Interactive image
- SMILES: CC(C)(C)[C@@H](C(=O)N)NC(=O)c1c2ccccc2n(n1)CCCCCF
- InChI: InChI=1S/C19H27FN4O2/c1-19(2,3)16(17(21)25)22-18(26)15-13-9-5-6-10-14(13)24(23-15)12-8-4-7-11-20/h5-6,9-10,16H,4,7-8,11-12H2,1-3H3,(H2,21,25)(H,22,26)/t16-/m1/s1; Key:SOYDDJYBRCNNIT-MRXNPFEDSA-N

5F-ADB-PINACA is a cannabinoid designer drug that is an ingredient in some synthetic cannabis products. It is a potent agonist of the CB_{1} receptor and CB_{2} receptor with EC_{50} values of 0.24 nM and 2.1 nM respectively.

== Metabolism ==
Twelve 5F-ADB-PINACA major metabolites were identified in several incubations with cryopreserved human hepatocytes. Major metabolic reactions included oxidative defluorination followed by carboxylation.

== Legality ==
5F-ADB-PINACA is listed in the Fifth Schedule of the Misuse of Drugs Act (MDA) and therefore illegal in Singapore as of May 2015.

== See also ==
- 5F-AB-PINACA
- 5F-ADB
- 5F-AMB
- 5F-APINACA
- AB-FUBINACA
- AB-CHFUPYCA
- AB-CHMINACA
- AB-PINACA
- ADB-CHMINACA
- ADB-FUBINACA
- ADB-PINACA
- ADBICA
- APICA
- APINACA
- APP-FUBINACA
- MDMB-CHMICA
- MDMB-CHMINACA
- MDMB-FUBINACA
- PX-1
- PX-2
- PX-3
