= 4F-MDMB-BINACA =

Chemical compound

Legal status
- Legal status: BR: Class F2 (Prohibited psychotropics); CA: Schedule II; DE: Anlage II (Authorized trade only, not prescriptible); UK: Class B; UN: Psychotropic Schedule II

Identifiers
- IUPAC name: Methyl (S)-2-(1-(4-fluorobutyl)-1H-indazole-3-carboxamido)-3,3-dimethylbutanoate
- CAS Number: 2390036-46-9
- PubChem CID: 145707216
- ChemSpider: 71117201
- UNII: ZH38UTM145
- KEGG: C22799
- CompTox Dashboard (EPA): DTXSID001017266

Chemical and physical data
- Formula: C_{19}H_{26}FN_{3}O_{3}
- Molar mass: 363.433 g·mol^{−1}
- 3D model (JSmol): Interactive image
- SMILES: O=C(N[C@H](C(OC)=O)C(C)(C)C)C1=NN(CCCCF)C2=C1C=CC=C2
- InChI: InChI=1S/C19H26FN3O3/c1-19(2,3)16(18(25)26-4)21-17(24)15-13-9-5-6-10-14(13)23(22-15)12-8-7-11-20/h5-6,9-10,16H,7-8,11-12H2,1-4H3,(H,21,24)/t16-/m1/s1; Key:GZGKSDAMWRWYOZ-MRXNPFEDSA-N

4F-MDMB-BINACA (also known as MDMB-4F-BINACA using systematic EMCDDA nomenclature or 4F-MDMB-BUTINACA) is an indazole-based synthetic cannabinoid from the indazole-3-carboxamide family. It should not be confused with the amantadine analogue 4F-ABINACA. It has been used as an active ingredient in synthetic cannabis products and sold as a designer drug since late 2018. 4F-MDMB-BINACA is an agonist of the CB1 receptor (EC_{50} = 7.39 nM), though it is unclear whether it is selective for this target. In December 2019, the UNODC announced scheduling recommendations placing 4F-MDMB-BINACA into Schedule II throughout the world.

== Related compounds ==
The corresponding indole core analogue, 4F-MDMB-BICA (4F-MDMB-BUTICA), has also been widely sold as a designer drug by chemical providers on the internet, first being identified in May 2020.

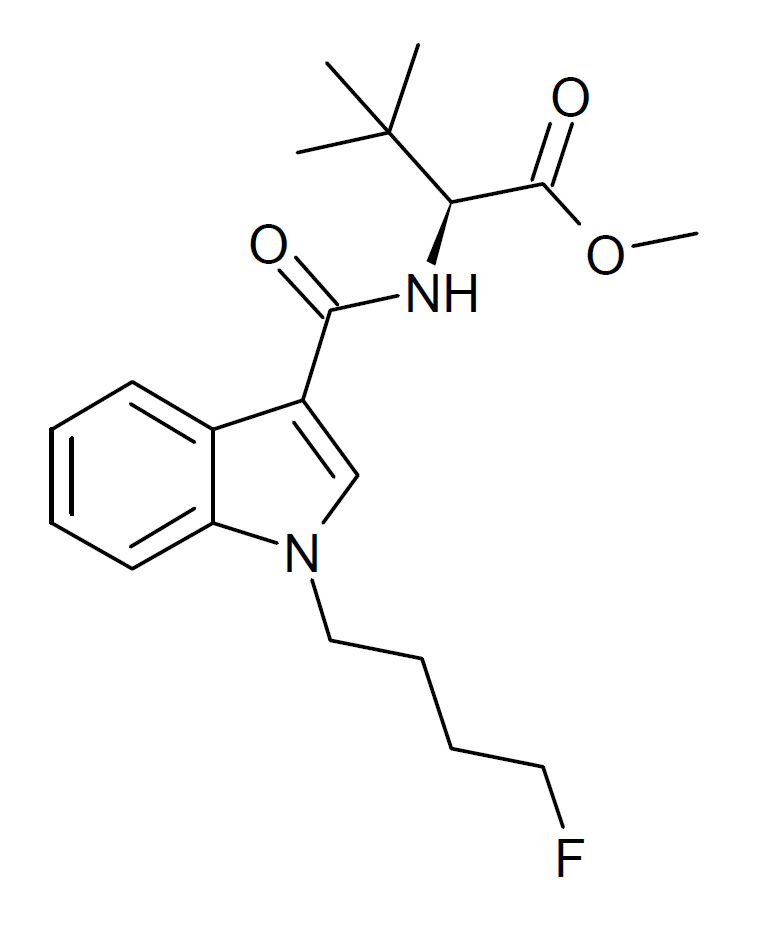
4F-MDMB-BICA

4F-MDMB-BINACA may be confused with a positional isomer of 5F-MDMB-PINACA called 4F-MDMB-PINACA, because of the use of the confusing names 5F-ADB and 4F-ADB. These confusing shorter names were not scientifically adopted but were used by websites selling the drugs to the public.

== Legal status ==
=== United Kingdom ===
It is illegal to sell, distribute, supply, transport or trade the pharmaceutical drug under the Psychoactive Substances Act 2016.

=== United States ===
4F-MDMB-BINACA is considered a Schedule I controlled substance as a positional isomer of the Schedule I compound 5F-AMB (5F-MMB-PINACA / 5F-AMB-PINACA). There have been charges brought against individuals for possession and distribution of 4F-MDMB-BINACA due to it being a positional isomer of 5F-AMB.

The DEA has temporarily placed 4F-MDMB-BUTICA (the indole core analog of 4F-MDMB-BINACA) into Schedule I status starting on December 12th, 2023, for up to 2 years, during which it's possible the DEA could file for permanent scheduling within those 2 years. If the DEA does not file for permanent placement, the temporary Schedule I order will expire on December 12th, 2025.

North Dakota has placed 4F-MDMB-BINACA into Schedule I on 04/27/2023.

== See also ==
- 5F-MDMB-PINACA
- 5F-MDMB-PICA
- 5F-MMB-PINACA
- 5F-MPP-PICA
- AB-FUBINACA
- MDMB-BINACA
- MDMB-5'Br-BUTINACA
