= Berzelia cordifolia =

Scientific classification
- Kingdom: Plantae
- Clade: Tracheophytes
- Clade: Angiosperms
- Clade: Eudicots
- Clade: Asterids
- Order: Bruniales
- Family: Bruniaceae
- Genus: Berzelia
- Species: B. cordifolia

Binomial name
- Berzelia cordifolia Schltdl. (1831)

Synonyms
- Brunia cordifolia D.Dietr.

Species of flowering plant

Berzelia cordifolia is a shrub that belongs to the Bruniaceae family. The species is endemic to the Western Cape and is part of the fynbos. The plant occurs from the Potberg in the De Hoop nature reserve to the Breede River estuary at Infanta. It has an area of occurrence of 150 km^{2} and there are eight subpopulations. The species is threatened by invasive plants and coastal development.
