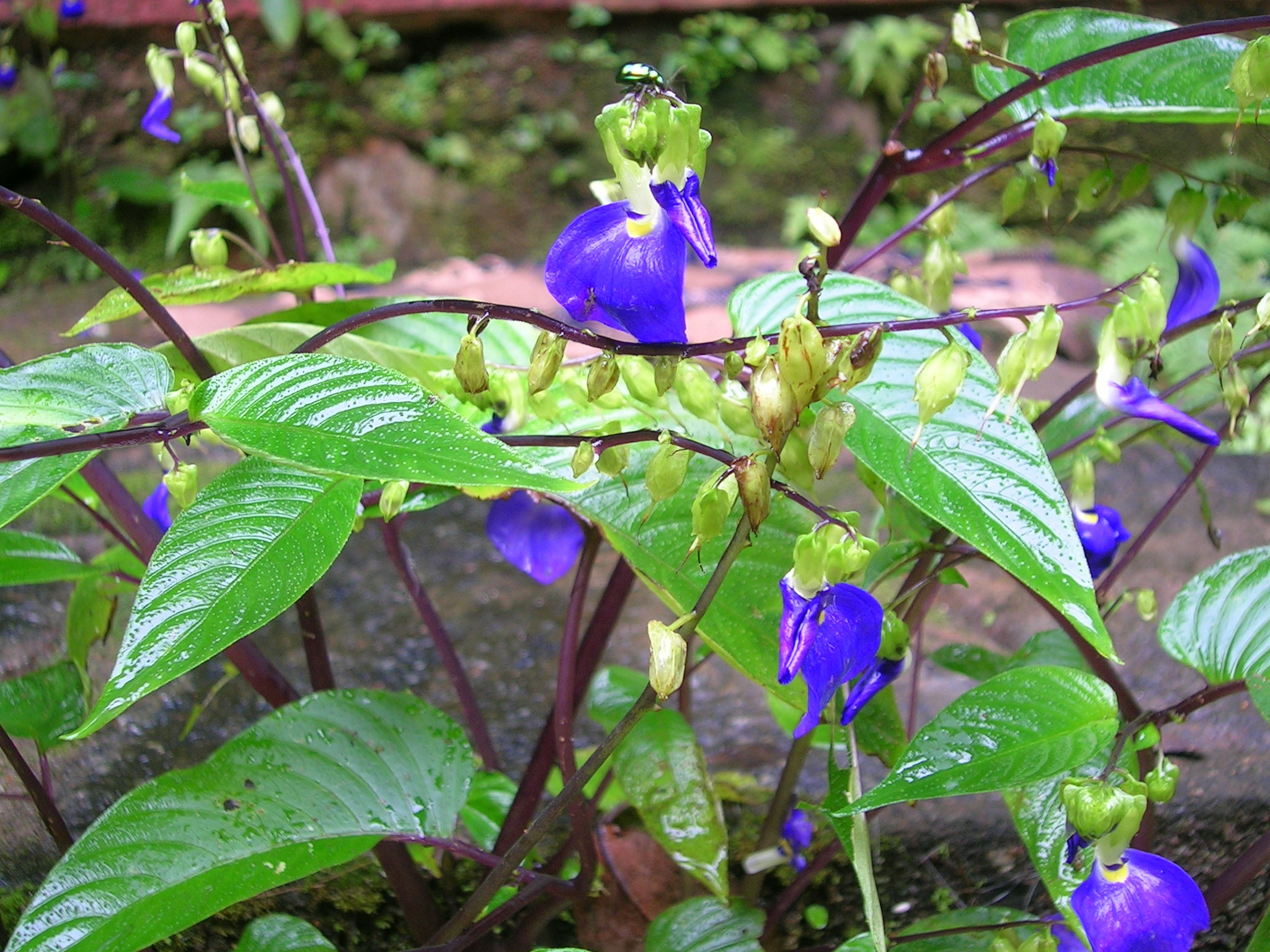
- Rhynchoglossum notonianum

Scientific classification
- Kingdom: Plantae
- Clade: Tracheophytes
- Clade: Angiosperms
- Clade: Eudicots
- Clade: Asterids
- Order: Lamiales
- Family: Gesneriaceae
- Subfamily: Didymocarpoideae
- Genus: Rhynchoglossum; Blume (1826)

Type species
- Rhynchoglossum obliquum Blume

Species
- 14; see text

Synonyms
- Antonia R.Br. in Wall. (1832), non Pohl; Glossanthus Klein ex Benth. (1835); Klugia Schltdl. (1833); Loxotis R.Br. ex Benth. (1835)

= Rhynchoglossum =

Genus of plants

Rhynchoglossum is a genus of plant in family Gesneriaceae. In recent times, members of the former genus Klugia are also included. Species within the broader genus are found in India, southern China to New Guinea and about three species in tropical America. The genus has a leaf arrangement that is termed as alternate-distichous and the leaves are asymmetric in shape. The flowers have two lips. The older genus Klugia had four stamens compared to the typical two but Klugia from southern India are found to be very close based on molecular evidence.

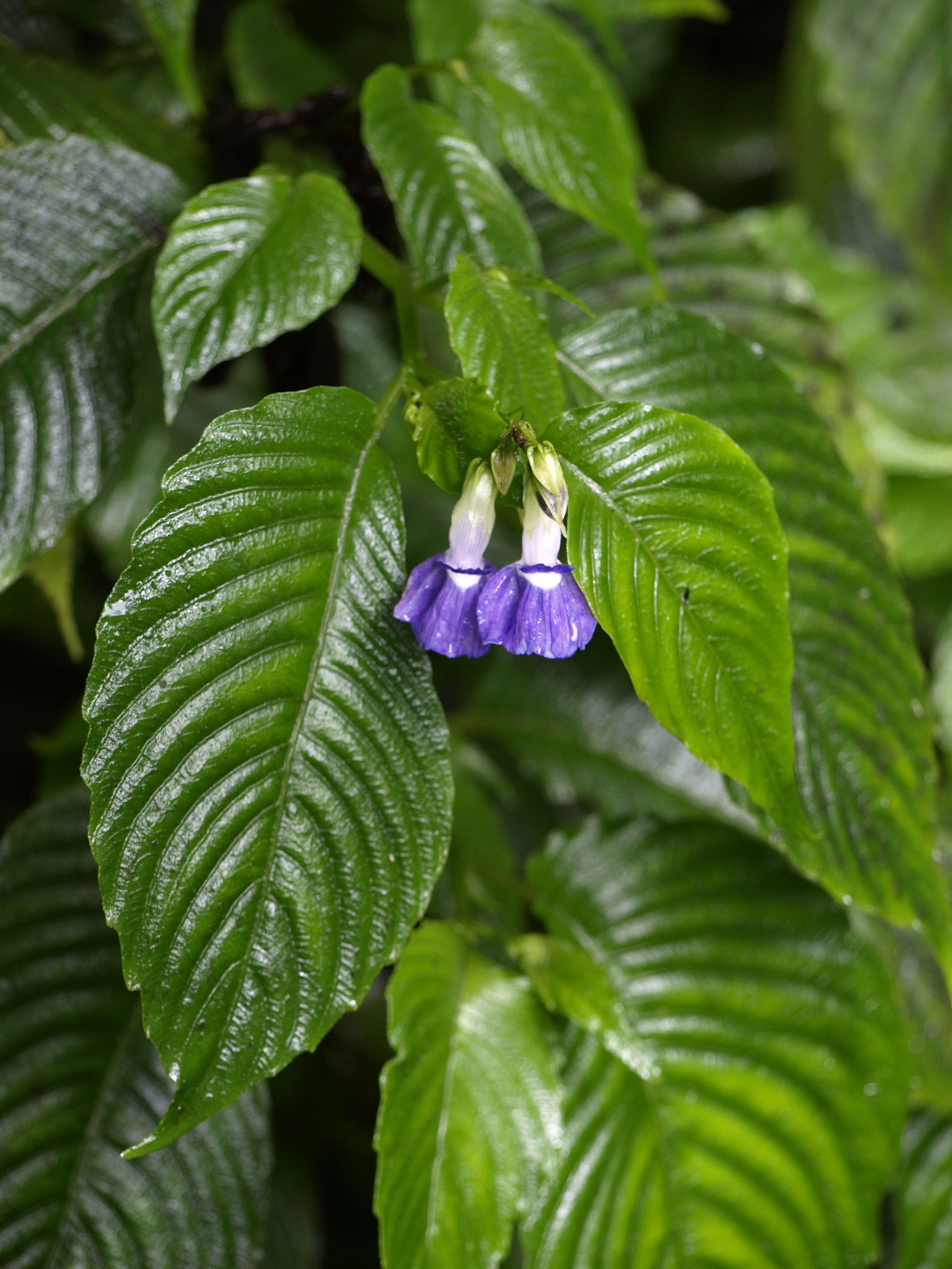
Rhychoglossum azureum

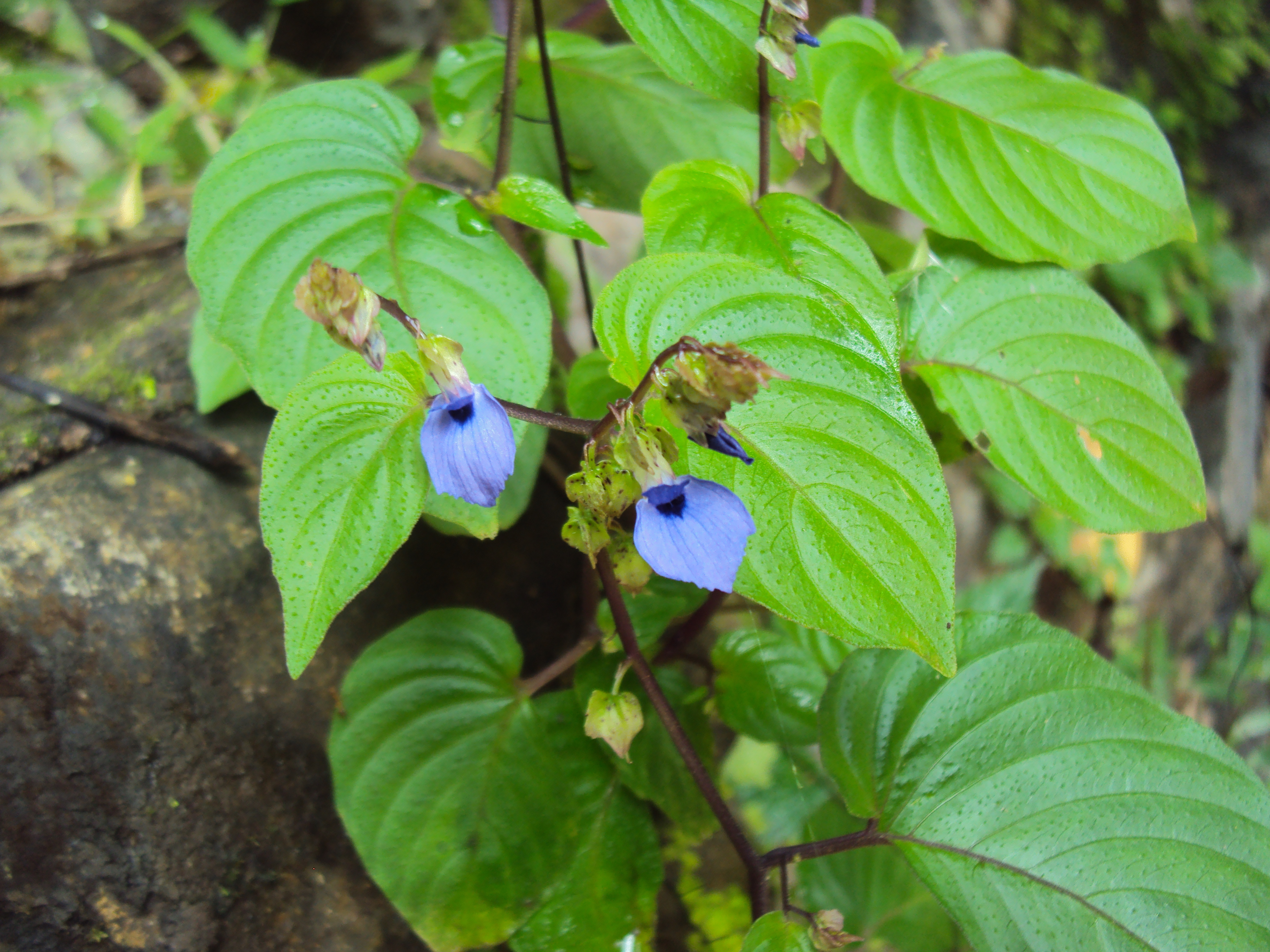
Rhynchoglossum obliquum

== Species ==
14 species are accepted.

1. Rhynchoglossum ampliatum (C.B.Clarke) B.L.Burtt
2. Rhynchoglossum ausculum Patthar. & Poopath
3. Rhynchoglossum azureum (Schltdl.) B.L.Burtt
4. Rhynchoglossum borneense Merr.
5. Rhynchoglossum capsulare Ohwi ex Karton.
6. Rhynchoglossum gardneri W.L.Theob. & Grupe
7. Rhynchoglossum klugioides C.B.Clarke
8. Rhynchoglossum lazulinum A.S.Rao & J.Joseph
9. Rhynchoglossum mirabilis Patthar.
10. Rhynchoglossum notonianum (Wall.) B.L.Burtt
11. Rhynchoglossum obliquum Blume
12. Rhynchoglossum omeiense W.T.Wang
13. Rhynchoglossum saccatum Patthar.
14. Rhynchoglossum spumosum Elmer
