= Ernst Hallier =

German botanist and mycologist

Ernst Hallier (15 November 1831, in Hamburg – 19 December 1904, in Dachau) was a German botanist and mycologist.

As a young man he was trained as a gardener, later studying botany at the universities of Berlin, Jena and Göttingen. From 1858 he served as an instructor at the Pharmaceutical Institute in Jena, where in 1860 he obtained his habilitation. In 1865 he became an associate professor, resigning his professorship 19 years later (1884).

Hallier claimed that many diseases were caused by fungi including cholera, typhoid and measles. He claimed that he had extracted the causal fungi from patients but other scientists found that this was merely a case of external contamination. His work was subsequently largely discredited after it was criticized by Heinrich Anton de Bary. In 1869 he founded the journal Zeitschrift für Parasitenkunde.

== Written works ==
He published revisions of Wilhelm Daniel Joseph Koch's "Taschenbuch der deutschen und schweizerischen Flora" (Handbook of German and Swiss Flora) and "Synopsis florae germanicae et helveticae" (3rd edition, 1890 ff.). He was also responsible for a revision of Schlechtendal, Langethal & Schenk's "Flora von Deutschland" (5th edition, Gera 1880–88, 30 volumes). The following are some of his original botanical writings:

- Die Vegetation auf Helgoland, 1863 - Vegetation of Helgoland.
- Darwin's Lehre und die Specification, 1865 - Darwin's teaching and specification.
- Die pflanzlichen Parasiten des menschlichen Körpers: Für Ärzte, Botaniker und Studirende zugleich als Anleitung in das Studium der niederen Organismen, 1866 - Vegetative parasites of the human body, etc.
- Das Cholera-Contagium: Botanische Untersuchungen, Aerzten und Naturforschern mitgetheilt , 1867 - The cholera contagion, etc.
- Rechtfertigung gegen die Angriffe des Herrn Professor Dr. de Bary: Sendschreiben an deutsche und auswärtige Gelehrte, 1867 - Justification against the attacks of Professor Anton de Bary: missive to German and foreign scholars.
- Parasitologische Untersuchungen bezüglich auf die pflanzlichen Organismen bei Masern, Hungertyphus, Darmtyphus, Blattern, Kuhpocken, Schafpocken, Cholera nostras, etc. 1868 - Parasitological investigations: with respect to the plant organisms in measles and numerous other diseases.
- Reform der pilzforschung: Offenes Sendschreiben an Herrn professor De Bary zu Strassburg, 1875 - Reform in regards to mushroom research: Open letter to Anton de Bary at Strasbourg.
- Schule der systematischen Botanik, 1878 - School of systematic botany.
- Untersuchungen über Diatomeen insbesondere über ihre Bewegungen und ihre Vegetative Fortpflanzung, 1880 - Studies of diatoms, particularly studies on their movements and vegetative propagation.
- Die Pestkrankheiten (Infektionskrankheiten) der Kulturgewächse : Nach streng bakteriologischer Methode untersucht und in völliger Uebereinstimmung mit Robert Kochs Entdeckungen, 1898 - Infectious diseases of cultivated plants: examined by strict bacteriological methods and in complete harmony with Robert Koch's discoveries.

Hallier was a disciple of the philosophy of Jakob Friedrich Fries (1773-1843), and was the author of several philosophical writings:

- Die Weltanschauung des Naturforschers (Jena 1875) - The belief of the scientist.
- Naturwissenschaft, Religion und Erziehung (1875) - Science, religion and education.
- Kulturgeschichte des 19. Jahrhunderts in ihren Beziehungen zu der Entwickelung der Naturwissenschaften (Stuttgart, 1889) - Cultural history of the 19th century in its relationship to the development of natural sciences.
- Ästhetik der Natur (1890) - Aesthetics of nature.
