= Buddleja brachiata =

Scientific classification
- Kingdom: Plantae
- Clade: Tracheophytes
- Clade: Angiosperms
- Clade: Eudicots
- Clade: Asterids
- Order: Lamiales
- Family: Scrophulariaceae
- Genus: Buddleja
- Species: B. brachiata

Binomial name
- Buddleja brachiata Cham. & Schltdl.

Species of flowering plant

Buddleja brachiata is endemic to southern Brazil from Goiás to São Paulo, where it grows on disturbed areas along rivers. The species was first described and named by Chamisso and von Schlechtendal in 1827.

== Description ==
Buddleja brachiata is a small, scandent dioecious shrub with light-brown finely striated bark. The branches are subquadrangular, the youngest growth tomentulose. The leaves are subsessile, ovate, 6–12 cm long by 3–6 cm wide, glabrous and tomentulose below. The white inflorescence is 10–20 cm long, comprising two orders of leafy-bracted branches. The sessile flowers are borne in pairs of capitate cymules, each 0.5–0.7 cm in diameter, and comprising 3–9 flowers. The corolla is campanulate, 2–3 mm long.

The inflorescences of the species suggest a close relationship with B. hieronymi, B. interrupta, and B. iresinoides found in the Andes; its occurrence in Brazil probably owing to the much drier conditions prevalent in the Amazon region during the Pleistocene period.

== Cultivation ==
The shrub is not known to be in cultivation.
