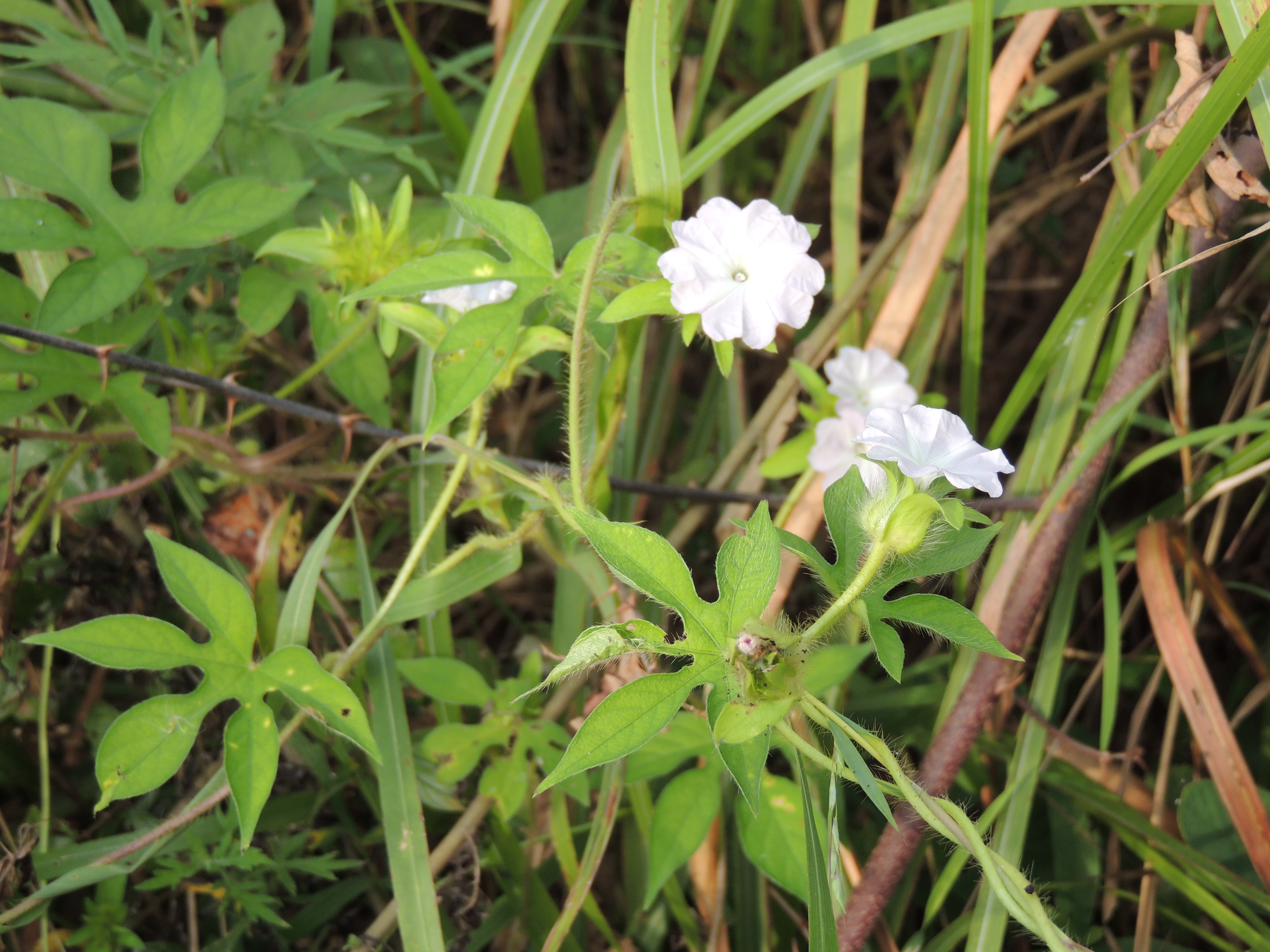
- Ipomoea pes-tigridis in flower in Jim Corbett National Park, Uttarakhand, India
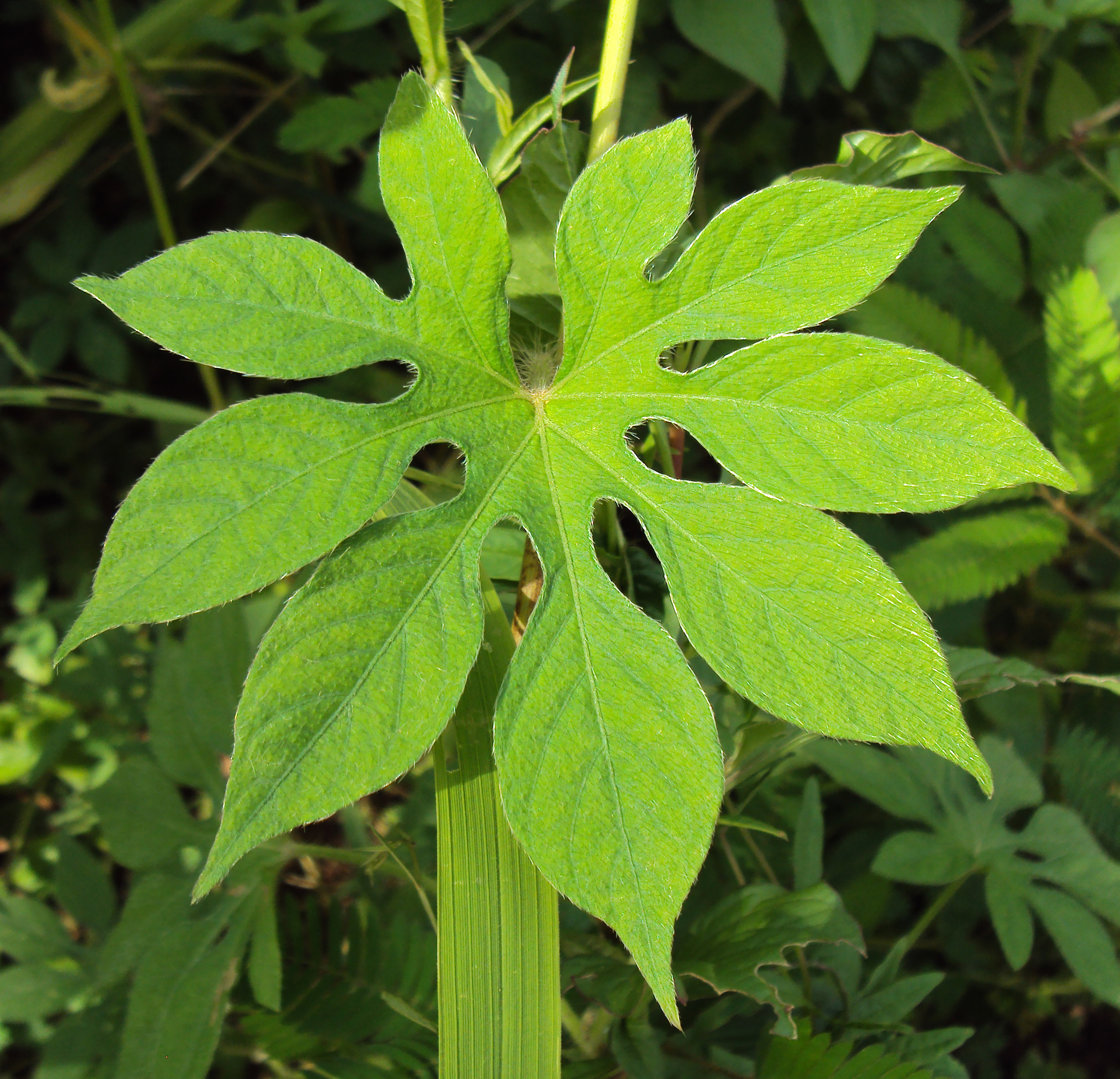
- Ipomoea pes-tigridis leaf, Ullickal, Kerala, India

Scientific classification
- Kingdom: Plantae
- Clade: Tracheophytes
- Clade: Angiosperms
- Clade: Eudicots
- Clade: Asterids
- Order: Solanales
- Family: Convolvulaceae
- Genus: Ipomoea
- Species: I. pes-tigridis

Binomial name
- Ipomoea pes-tigridis L.

Synonyms
- Neorthosis tigrina Rafin. Ipomoea tigripes Stokes; Ipomoea tigrina Pers. Ipomoea pes-tigridis f. africana Hallier; Ipomoea hepaticifolia L. Ipomoea capitellata Choisy; Convolvulus pestigridis (L.) Spreng. Convolvulus hepaticifolius Spreng. Convolvulus capitellatus Buch.-Ham. ex Wall. Convolvulus bryoniifolius Sims; Convolvulus bryoniifolius Salisb. Convolvuloides palmata Moench

= Ipomoea pes-tigridis =

Species of flowering plant

Ipomoea pes-tigridis is a species of Ipomoea in the family Convolvulaceae. It is known as tiger foot ipomoea or tiger foot morning glory. The species is native to tropical and subtropical regions of Asia, Africa, and New Guinea, and is naturalised in Australia. It grows from sea level up to 400 m. It is the type species of the genus Ipomoea.

== Description ==
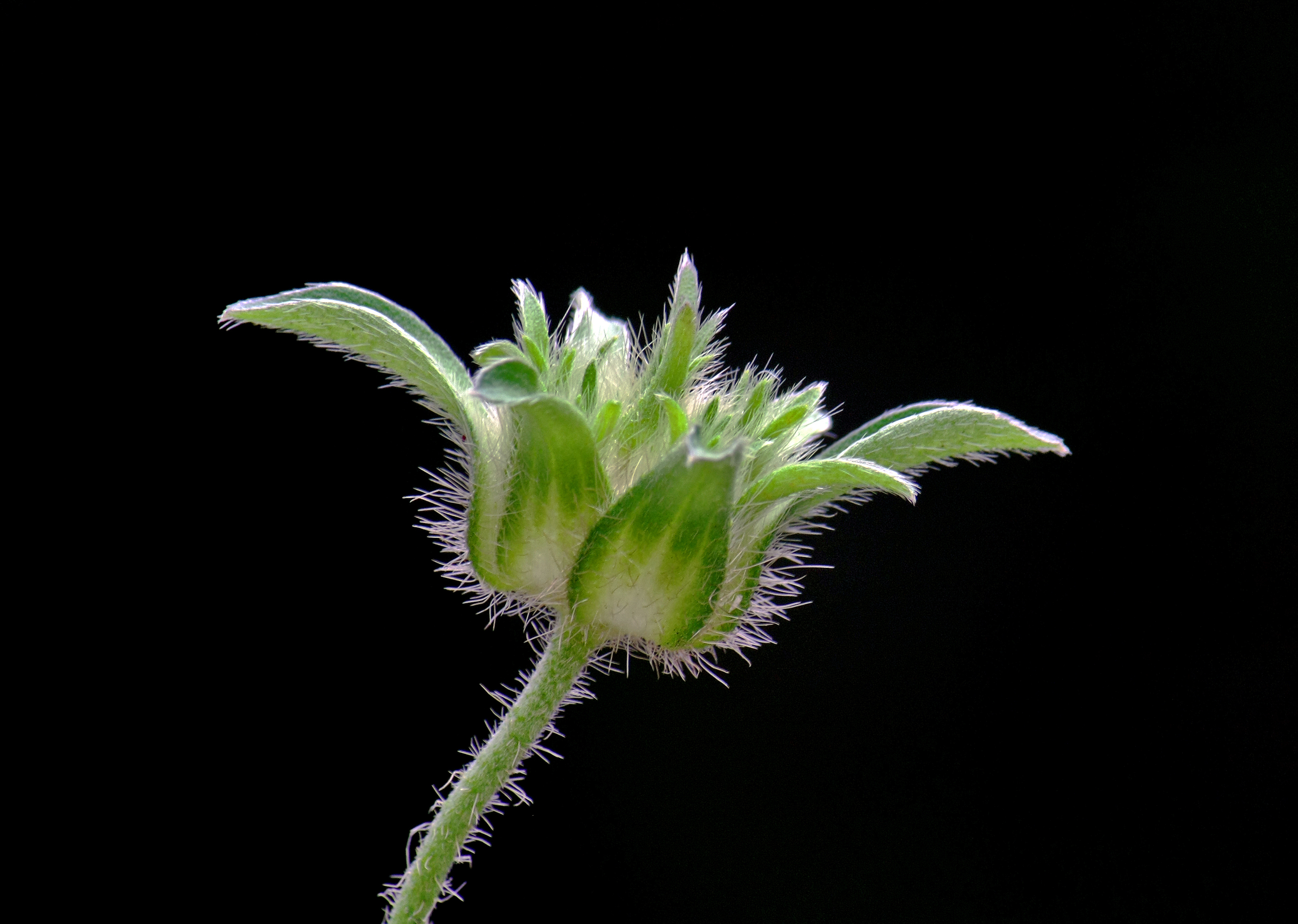
Flower bud, Kallady, Sri Lanka.

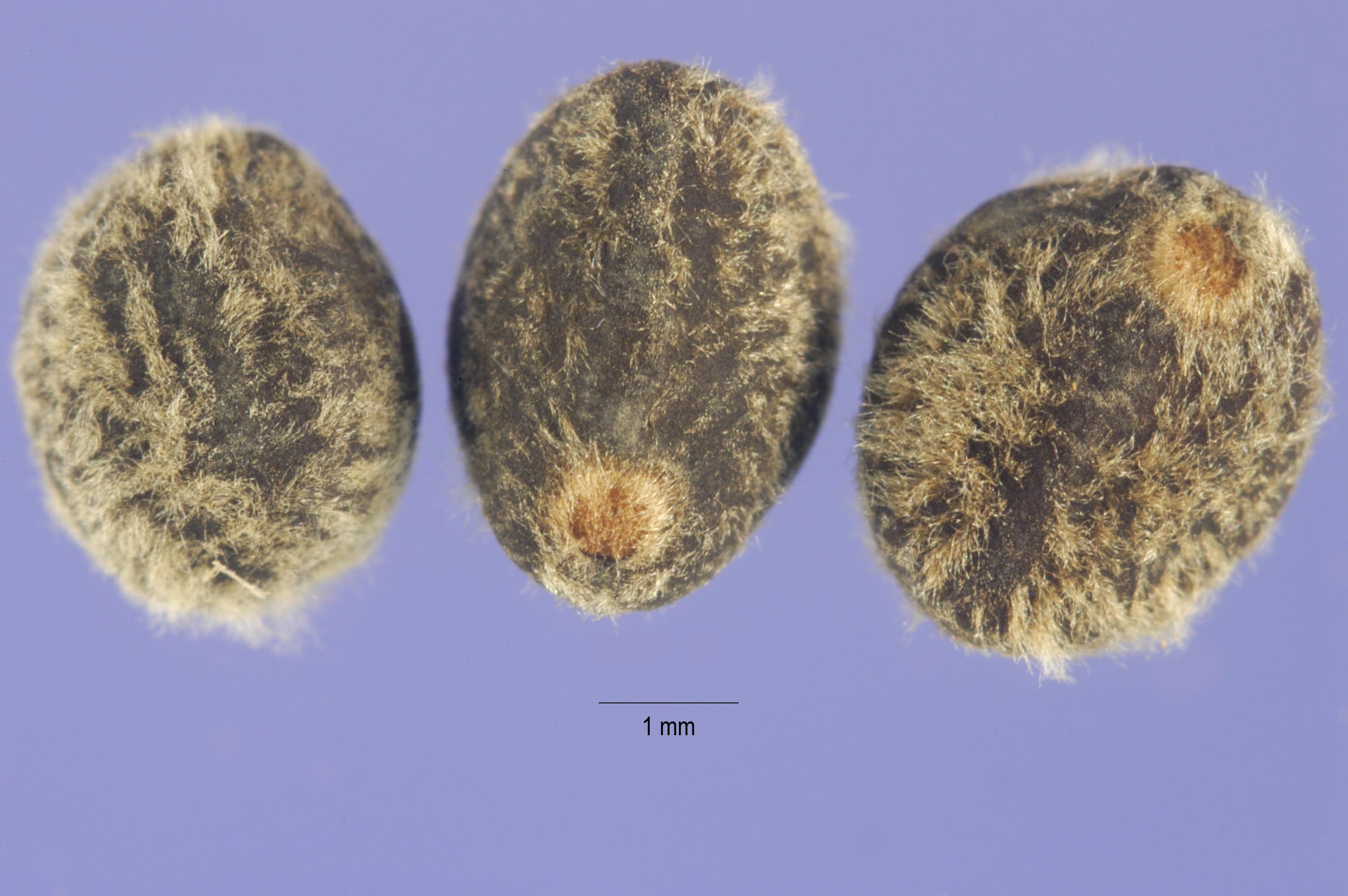
Ipomoea pes-tigridis seeds

Ipomoea pes-tigridis is an annual plant, hairy, growing as a vine. It can grow up to 1–3 m (3 ft 3 in – 9 ft 10 in). The leaves are palmately lobed, 6–10 cm (2.4–3.9 in) diameter, with 5-9 lobes on edge of the leaf; the lobes are elliptic, with a narrowed base; the sinus between the lobes being rounded. Its flowering period is between September and November. The trumpet-shaped flowers are white, 4 cm (1.6 in) long, the corolla opening to 3 cm (1.2 in) diameter, and has five points. The flowers are in clusters, but usually only one open at a time in each cluster; the individual flowers open after 4 pm, and wither by the following morning.
