= Jonathan Carl Zenker =

German naturalist (1799–1837)

Jonathan Carl (or Karl) Zenker (1 March 1799 – 6 November 1837) was a German naturalist born in Sundremda, located in the Saalfeld-Rudolstadt district. The standard author abbreviation Zenker is used to indicate this person as the author when citing a botanical name.

Originally a student of theology at the University of Jena, he subsequently devoted his energies to science and medicine. From 1823 he lived in Dresden, later returning to Jena, where on the basis of his dissertation "Batrachomyologia", he became a privat-docent of natural history. In 1828 he became an associate professor of botany and natural history, followed by a full professorship in 1836 (one year prior to his death at the age of 38).

A genus of grasses called Zenkeria is named in his honour. Also, he named the genus of fossil broad-leaf trees Credneria in honor of Karl August Credner.

== Selected writings ==
- Musci Thuringici: vivis exemplaribus exhibuerunt et illustraverunt, 1821–1825, exsiccata work (with David Nathanael Friedrich Dietrich, 1799–1888).
- Die Pflanzen und ihr wissenschaftliches Studium überhaupt : ein botanischer Grundriss zum Gebrauche academischer Vorträge und zum Selbststudium, 1830 - Scientific study of plants in general, etc.
- Zwei neue fossile Corallenarten, 1833 - Two new fossil coral-types.
- Beiträge zur Naturgeschichte der Urwelt. Organische Reste (Petrefacten) aus der Altenburger Braunkohlen-Formation, dem Blankenburger Quadersandtein, jenaischen bunten Sandstein und Böhmischen Übergangsgebirge, 1833 - Contributions to the natural history of the prehistoric world. Organic residues (petrifactions) from the Altenburg lignite formation, the Blankenburg blocks of sandstone, Jena's colorful sandstone and the Bohemian Übergangsgebirge.
- Flora von Thüringen und den angrenzenden Provinzen, (with Diederich Franz Leonhard von Schlechtendal (1794–1866), Christian Eduard Langethal (1806–1878) and Ernst Schenk) - Flora of Thuringia and neighboring provinces.

== See also ==
- Category:Taxa named by Jonathan Carl Zenker
