= Niphogeton =

Scientific classification
- Kingdom: Plantae
- Clade: Tracheophytes
- Clade: Angiosperms
- Clade: Eudicots
- Clade: Asterids
- Order: Apiales
- Family: Apiaceae
- Subfamily: Apioideae
- Tribe: Selineae
- Genus: Niphogeton; Schltdl.

Synonyms
- Oreosciadium Wedd.; Triphylleion Suess.; Urbanosciadium H.Wolff

Genus of flowering plants

Niphogeton is a genus of flowering plant in the family Apiaceae.

== Species ==
As of December 2022, Plants of the World Online accepted the following species:

- Niphogeton azorelloides Mathias & Constance
- Niphogeton boliviana Mathias & Constance
- Niphogeton chirripoi (Suess.) Mathias & Constance
- Niphogeton cleefii Mathias & Constance
- Niphogeton colombiana Mathias & Constance
- Niphogeton dissecta (Benth.) J.F.Macbr.
- Niphogeton fruticosa Mathias & Constance
- Niphogeton glaucescens (Kunth) J.F.Macbr.
- Niphogeton josei Mathias & Constance
- Niphogeton kalbreyeri (H.Wolff) Mathias & Constance
- Niphogeton killipiana Mathias & Constance
- Niphogeton lingula (Wedd.) Mathias & Constance
- Niphogeton magna J.F.Macbr.
- Niphogeton pusilla (Wedd.) Mathias & Constance
- Niphogeton scabra (H.Wolff) J.F.Macbr.
- Niphogeton sprucei (H.Wolff) Mathias & Constance
- Niphogeton stricta (H.Wolff) Mathias & Constance
- Niphogeton ternata (Willd. ex Schult.) Mathias & Constance
