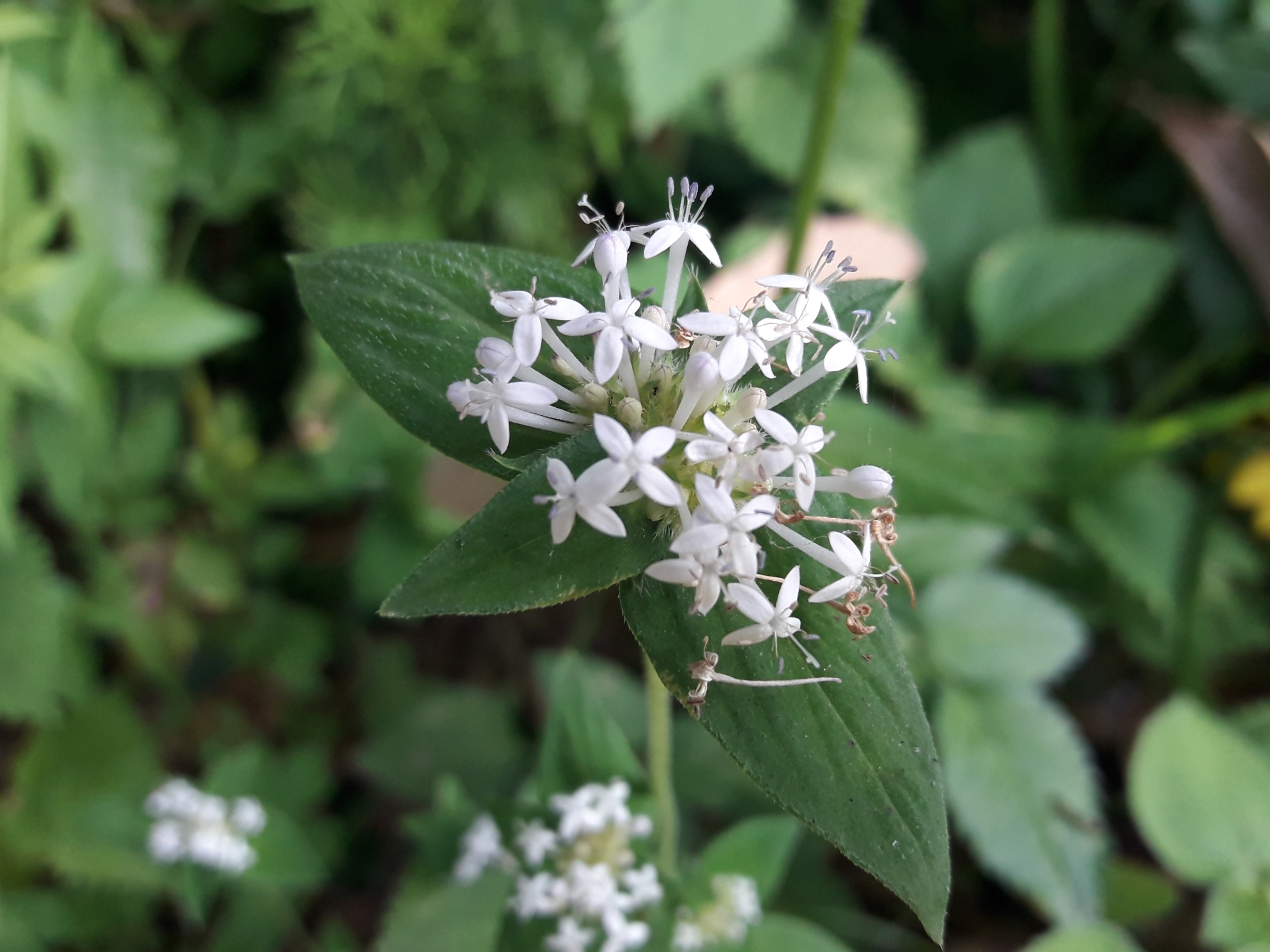
- Crusea longiflora

Scientific classification
- Kingdom: Plantae
- Clade: Tracheophytes
- Clade: Angiosperms
- Clade: Eudicots
- Clade: Asterids
- Order: Gentianales
- Family: Rubiaceae
- Subfamily: Rubioideae
- Tribe: Spermacoceae
- Genus: Crusea; Schltdl. & Cham.

Type species
- Crusea rubra (syn. of Crusea hispida) (Jacq.) Schltdl. & Cham.

= Crusea =

Genus of plants

Crusea (common name saucer flower) is a genus of angiosperms (flowering plants) in the family Rubiaceae. The genus is found in the south-western United States (Arizona and New Mexico), Mexico, and Central America. A few species are naturalized in Cuba and Puerto Rico.

== Species ==
- Crusea andersoniorum Lorence – Oaxaca
- Crusea calcicola Greenm – San Luis Potosí, Querétaro, Guerrero, Oaxaca, Honduras
- Crusea calocephala DC. – widespread from Tamaulipas to Honduras
- Crusea coccinea DC.
  - Crusea coccinea var. breviloba Loes. – from Sinaloa to Guatemala and Belize
  - Crusea coccinea var. chiriquensis W.R.Anderson – Costa Rica and Panama
  - Crusea coccinea var. coccinea – from Jalisco to Oaxaca
- Crusea coronata B.L.Rob. & Greenm. – from Sonora to Oaxaca
- Crusea diversifolia (Kunth) W.R.Anderson – widespread from Arizona and New Mexico to Guatemala
- Crusea hispida (Mill.) Rob.
  - Crusea hispida var. grandiflora (Paul G.Wilson) W.R.Anderson – Guerrero, México State, Distrito Federal
  - Crusea hispida var. hispida – widespread across much of Mexico and naturalized in Cuba
- Crusea longiflora (Roem. & Schult.) W.R.Anderson – widespread across much of Mexico and naturalized in Puerto Rico
- Crusea lucida Benth. – Sonora, Sinaloa, Jalisco, Nayarit, Colima, Michoacán, Guerrero
- Crusea megalocarpa (A.Gray) S.Watson – widespread across much of Mexico
- Crusea parviflora Hook. & Arn. – widespread across much of Mexico, south to Nicaragua
- Crusea psyllioides (Kunth) W.R.Anderson – widespread across much of Mexico
- Crusea pulcherrima Borhidi & Salas-Mor. – Oaxaca
- Crusea setosa (M.Martens & Galeotti) Standl. & Steyerm. – widespread across much of Mexico, south to Nicaragua
- Crusea simplex (Willd.) J.H.Kirkbr. & Wiersema – Mexico, Guatemala, and the southwestern United States
- Crusea wrightii A.Gray
  - Crusea wrightii var. angustifolia W.R.Anderson – central and southern Mexico
  - Crusea wrightii var. wrightii – widespread across much of Mexico, north into Arizona
