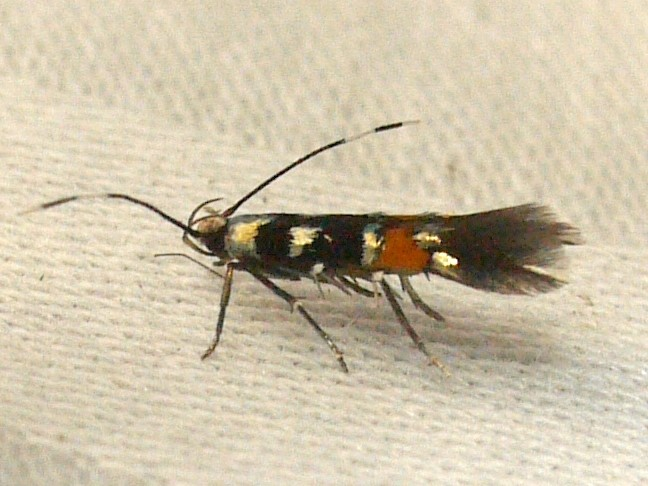

Scientific classification
- Kingdom: Animalia
- Phylum: Arthropoda
- Clade: Pancrustacea
- Class: Insecta
- Order: Lepidoptera
- Family: Cosmopterigidae
- Genus: Cosmopterix
- Species: C. molybdina

Binomial name
- Cosmopterix molybdina Hodges, 1962

= Cosmopterix molybdina =

Species of moth

Cosmopterix molybdina is a species of moth in the family Cosmopterigidae. It is known from the United States (Maine, Oregon, California) and Canada (British Columbia).

Adults have been recorded in January.

== Description ==
Male, female. Forewing length 4.3 millimetres (0.17 in). Head: frons and vertex shining golden bronze, neck tufts shining dark brown, collar shining leaden-gold with greenish and purplish reflections; labial palpus, first segment very short, pale brown, second segment three-quarters of the length of third, shining pale grey ventrally and apically, dorsally greyish white, third segment shining grey with golden gloss; scape dorsally shining dark brown with reddish gloss, ventrally pale greyish brown, antenna dark brown with reddish gloss, at two thirds a white ring of ten segments (the first two partly brown), followed towards apex by ten dark brown and seven white segments at apex. Thorax and tegulae shining leaden-gold with greenish reflection. Legs: dark brown with golden gloss, femur of hindleg shining brownish golden, forelegs and midlegs missing, tibia of hindleg with white medial and apical rings, spurs whitish dorsally, dark grey ventrally. Forewing shining dark brown with reddish golden gloss, a broad, very pale golden metallic fascia at one-fifth, widening towards dorsum, a pale yellow transverse fascia beyond the middle, narrowing towards dorsum, bordered at the inner edge by a tubercular silver to very pale golden metallic fascia, perpendicular at dorsum and narrowing towards costa, bordered on the outer edge by two large tubercular silver to very pale golden metallic costal and dorsal spots, both spots very close in middle but not touching, the dorsal spot about one and a half time as large as the costal and more towards base, the fascia with some irregular dark brown lining on the outside, both spots with similar lining on the inside, apical line as a short golden-white streak in the cilia at apex, cilia dark brown around apex, paler towards base, hindwing pale greyish brown with reddish gloss, cilia greyish brown. Underside: forewing shining greyish brown, the apical line in the cilia at apex indistinctly visible, hindwing shining greyish brown on costa, shining grey on dorsum.

== Biology ==
The larvae feed on Ipomoea species. They mine the leaves of their host plant. Adults are on wing from mid-April to mid-July. Larvae found in Oregon in mid- to late June. Adults emerged in January.
