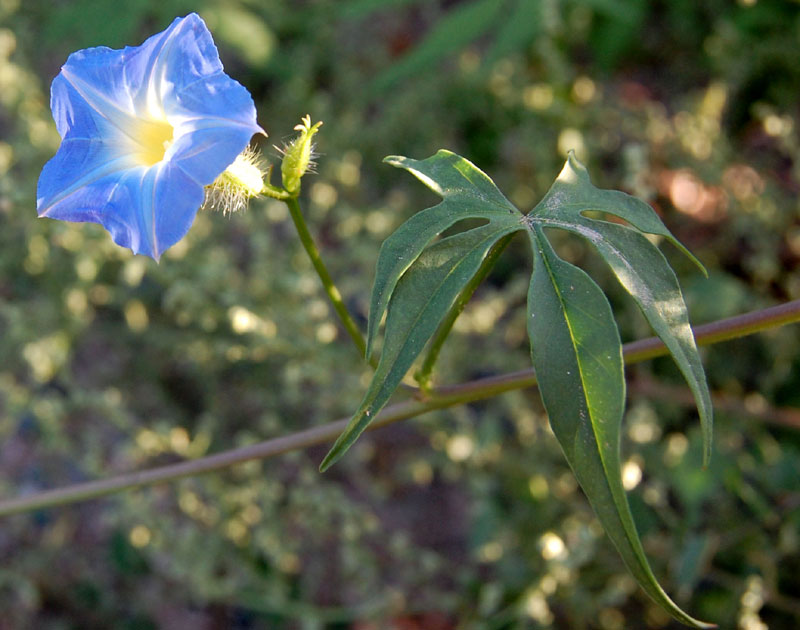
- Flowers, buds, and leaves

Scientific classification
- Kingdom: Plantae
- Clade: Tracheophytes
- Clade: Angiosperms
- Clade: Eudicots
- Clade: Asterids
- Order: Solanales
- Family: Convolvulaceae
- Genus: Ipomoea
- Species: I. barbatisepala

Binomial name
- Ipomoea barbatisepala A.Gray

= Ipomoea barbatisepala =

Species of morning glory

Ipomoea barbatisepala, commonly known as canyon morning glory, is a species of morning glory. It is native to the Southwestern United States, where it has been found in New Mexico and Arizona; in these regions, its native range overlaps with the non-native range of the closely related Ipomoea hederacea. It is also found in the west of Mexico.

== Description ==
The leaves are glabrous and deeply lobed, alternating on the stem. The flowers are blue or rarely white with a yellow center, usually appearing on the plant from July to December. The fruit is a capsule containing several dark seeds. The plant can be distinguished from the similar Ipomoea hederacea and Ipomoea cardiophylla by the leaf shape; while I. cardiophylla has heart-shaped leaves and I. hederacea has three-pointed leaves, I. barbatisepala has multi-lobed leaves.
