= Eugen von Schlechtendal =

Prussian lawyer and ornithologist (1830–1881)

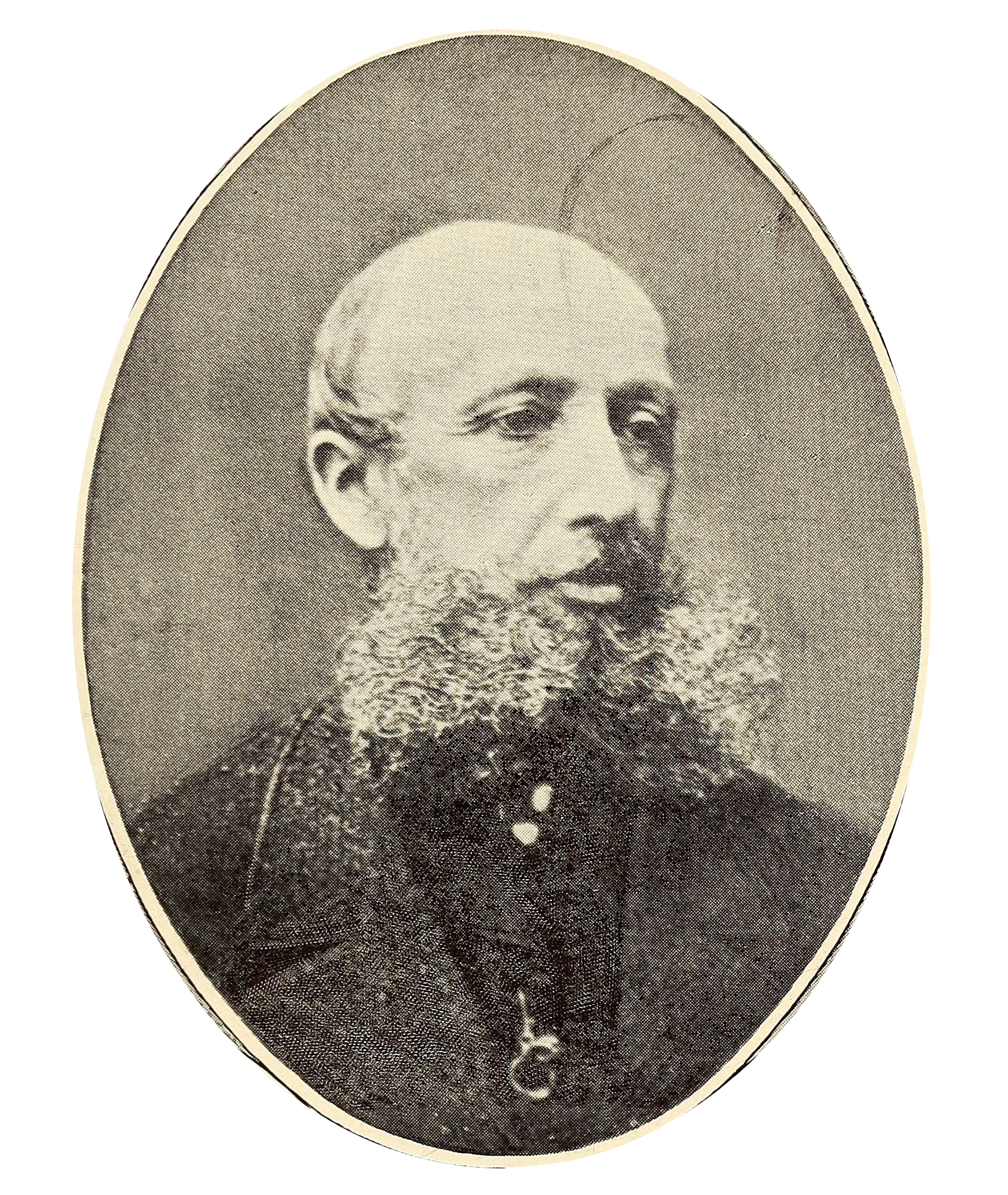

Eugen Dietrich Adalbert von Schlechtendal (8 July 1830 – 24 May 1881) was a Prussian administrator and aviculturist. He served as a district councillor in Merseburg and Ottweiler.

Von Schlechtendal was born in Berlin, the son of botany professor Diederich Franz Leonhard von Schlechtendal and his wife Ida Amalie Henriette Klug (1804–1884), the daughter of Johann Christoph Friedrich Klug (1775–1856). His middle name was from his godfather Adalbert von Chamisso. He studied at the Royal Pedagogical Institute in Halle until 1848. He then went to the University of Berlin to study law and worked at Halle where he continued studies until 1852. He worked as a royal court official but moved out of judicial work to civil administration. He worked as an assessor in Merseburg in 1857 and in 1858 at Trier. While serving as district administrator (Landrat) of Ottweiler from 1859 to 1865 he took special interest in public health. He received the Order of the Red Eagle (fourth class) for his services. He moved to Merseburg (as Regierungsrat) in 1866 so as to stay close to Halle. Even as a school boy he had an interest in raising young birds, and in his spare time he now he took an interest in aviculture and kept a large collection of exotic birds. He was a member of the German ornithological society from 1870. In 1875 he was a founder of the "Verein für Vogelkunde" in Halle. He became president of the German society for bird protection (Deutscher Verein zum Schutze der Vogelwelt) which was founded in 1878.
