= Crusea simplex =

Scientific classification
- Kingdom: Plantae
- Clade: Tracheophytes
- Clade: Angiosperms
- Clade: Eudicots
- Clade: Asterids
- Order: Gentianales
- Family: Rubiaceae
- Genus: Crusea
- Species: C. simplex

Binomial name
- Crusea simplex (Willd.) J.H.Kirkbr. & Wiersema

Synonyms
- Borreria subulata DC.; Crusea diversifolia W.R.Anderson, nom. illeg. superfl.; Crusea subulata (DC.) A.Gray, nom. illeg. homonym. post.; Crusea subulata var. leiocarpa Greenm.; Diodia subulata (DC.) Standl.; Knoxia simplex Willd.; Spermacoce diversifolia Kunth, nom. illeg. superfl.; Spermacoce subulata (DC.) Hemsl.

Species of plant

Crusea simplex is a species of flowering plant in the family Rubiaceae. It is an annual native to Mexico, Guatemala, and the southwestern United States.

== Description ==
Crusea simplex produces clusters of four-petaled tubular white flowers at the top of erect stems. Along green stems are small lanceolate-shaped leaves that grow opposite. Four white stamens with brownish-purple anthers stick out shortly above the opening of the flower.

== Range ==
It can be found in Arizona and New Mexico in the southwestern US, across Mexico, and in Guatemala.

== Habitat ==
Can be found on moist soils in the bottom of canyons, on hillsides, and in open or wooded areas.

== Taxonomy ==
The species was first described as Knoxia simplex by Carl Ludwig Willdenow in 1818. In 2020 Joseph Harold Kirkbride and John Harry Wiersema placed the species in genus Crusea as C. simplex.
