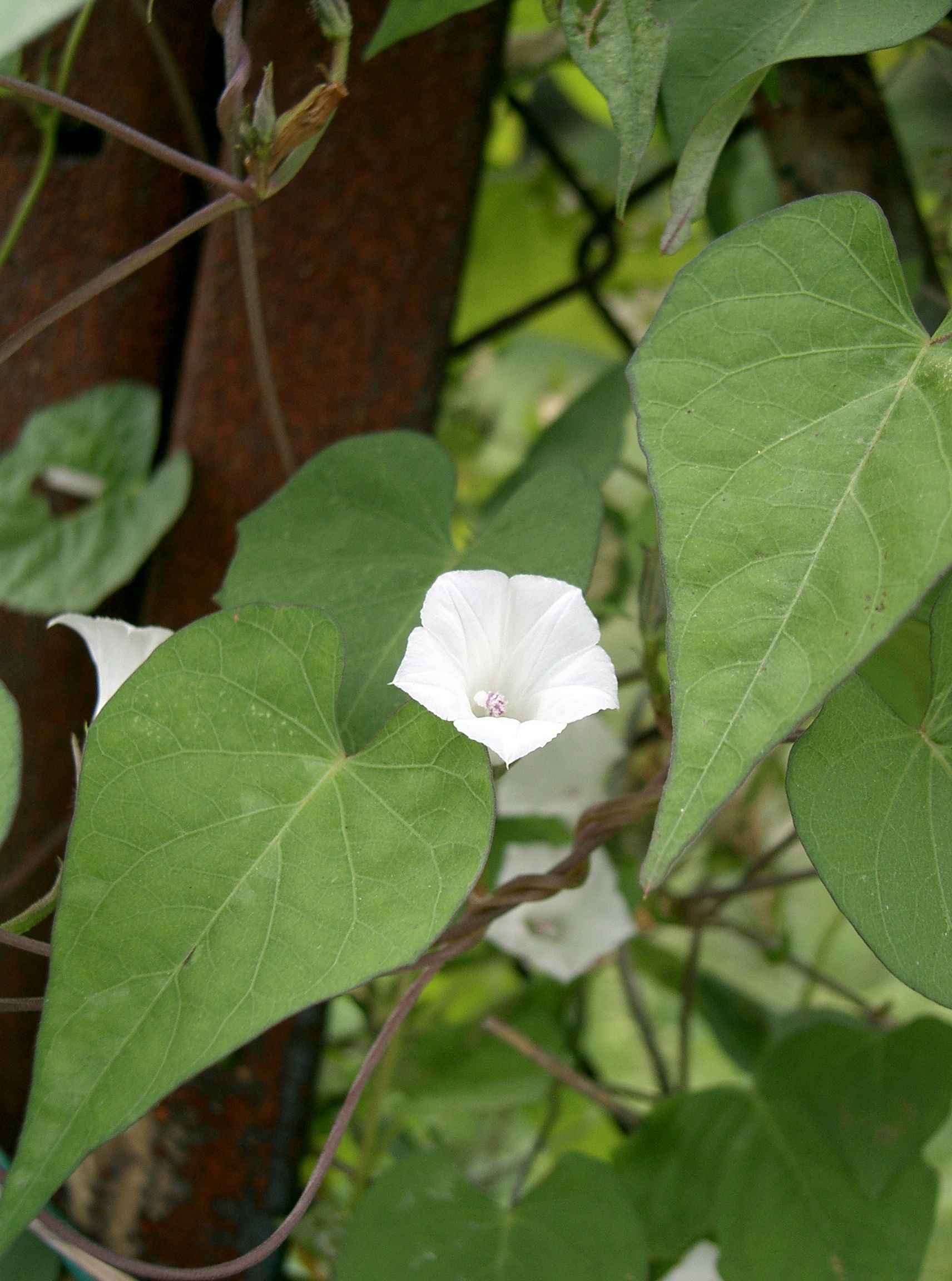

Scientific classification
- Kingdom: Plantae
- Clade: Embryophytes
- Clade: Tracheophytes
- Clade: Spermatophytes
- Clade: Angiosperms
- Clade: Eudicots
- Clade: Asterids
- Order: Solanales
- Family: Convolvulaceae
- Genus: Ipomoea
- Species: I. lacunosa

Binomial name
- Ipomoea lacunosa L.

= Ipomoea lacunosa =

Species of flowering plant

Ipomoea lacunosa, the whitestar, white morning-glory or pitted morning-glory, is a species that belongs to the genus Ipomoea. In this genus most members are commonly referred to as "morning glories". The name for the genus, Ipomoea, has roots in the Greek words ips and homoios, which translates to worm-like. This is a reference to the plant's vine-like growth. Lacunosa comes from a Latin word meaning air spaces, correlating with the venation of the leaves. Ipomoea lacunosa is native to the United States and grows annually. The flowers of this species are usually white and smaller than most other morning glories.

== Distribution ==
Since Ipomoea lacunosa is native to the United States, the plant can be found in multiple areas throughout the country. Ipomoea lacunosa occurs in almost every state on the east coast, as well as some states in the Midwest, and California. The states that the whitestar potato can be found in are as follows: Alabama, Arkansas, California, Washington D.C., Delaware, Florida, Georgia, Iowa, Illinois, Indiana, Kansas, Kentucky, Louisiana, Massachusetts, Maryland, Montana, Mississippi, North Carolina, New Jersey, New York, Ohio, Oklahoma, Pennsylvania, South Carolina, Tennessee, Texas, Virginia, and West Virginia. This species was also introduced to Canada and lives successfully in the province of Ontario. Although this plant grows rapidly, its tendency to be invasive is rather small in comparison to other members of the genus.

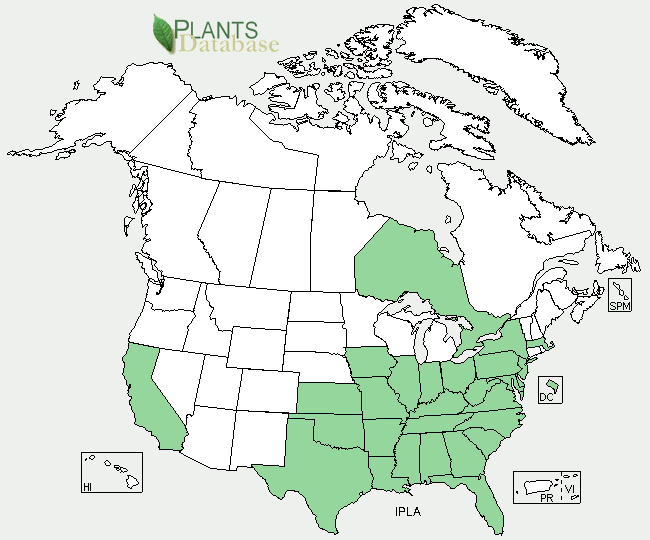
Distribution of I. lacunosa in North America.

== Habitat and ecology ==
Ipomoea lacunosa occurs in a variety of habitat types, including disturbed areas, It grows on prairie, riverbanks, lakeshores, and roadsides, and in cultivated and abandoned fields and meadows.

Insects associated with the plant include bees such as bumblebees, Melitoma taurea, Peponapis pruinosa, and Cemolobus ipomoea. The larvae of the plume moth Emmelina monodactyla feeds on the foliage, and it is host to several tortoise beetles.

== Morphology ==
The stem of I. lacunosa is a slightly hairy (white hairs), twisting, climbing and twining vine with a small taproot. It can reach 2 meters in length. I. lacunose depends on its vining habit for dispersal. The roots are fibrous and have a small taproot. In a mature plant, the leaves take on a cordate shape, with a pointed tip, although sometimes it may have 3 deep lobes. The leaves of a less mature plant are usually ovate. They are arranged alternately on the stem of the plant. The slender petioles are usually at least 3 centimeters long and have a slight adaxial groove. The leaves themselves can be up to 8 cm wide and 9.4 cm long. The margin of the leaf is typically purple and smooth. The upperside of the leaf may have a small amount of white hairs.

== Flowers and fruits ==
The stalks of the plant that bears flowers is rough and usually has 1-3 flowers. The funnel-shaped flowers of the plant are normally white, but on rare occasion the flowers can be light purple or pink. The five petals are joined (sympetalous) or shallowly lobed and are approximately 2.5 cm long. The sepals are light green, lanceolate, take on a leathery texture and can be up to 11.5 mm long. The anthers are a pinkish-purple and the filaments are white. The ovary is superior, cone-like in shape, and green. There is a single white stigma and style. There are five stamen. The flowers have no perceptible or obvious scent. There are large seed capsules in the flower that are spherical in shape and hairy. The seeds themselves are irregularly oblong, shiny, and brown or black.

Fruit is seen in the form of a capsule that is slightly flattened or rounded in shape, and can be up to 10 millimetres (0.39 in) wide.

== Food usage ==
Ipomoea lacunosa is one of the species of Ipomoea that is used on a small scale by humans. The whitestar potato that it produces is traditionally consumed by a number of Native American tribes like the Chiricahua Apaches.

Other animals usually avoid eating this plant due to the high alkaloid content which makes it unpalatable. In some cases the amount of alkaloid in the plant can make it toxic. However certain caterpillars are capable of digesting the plant.
