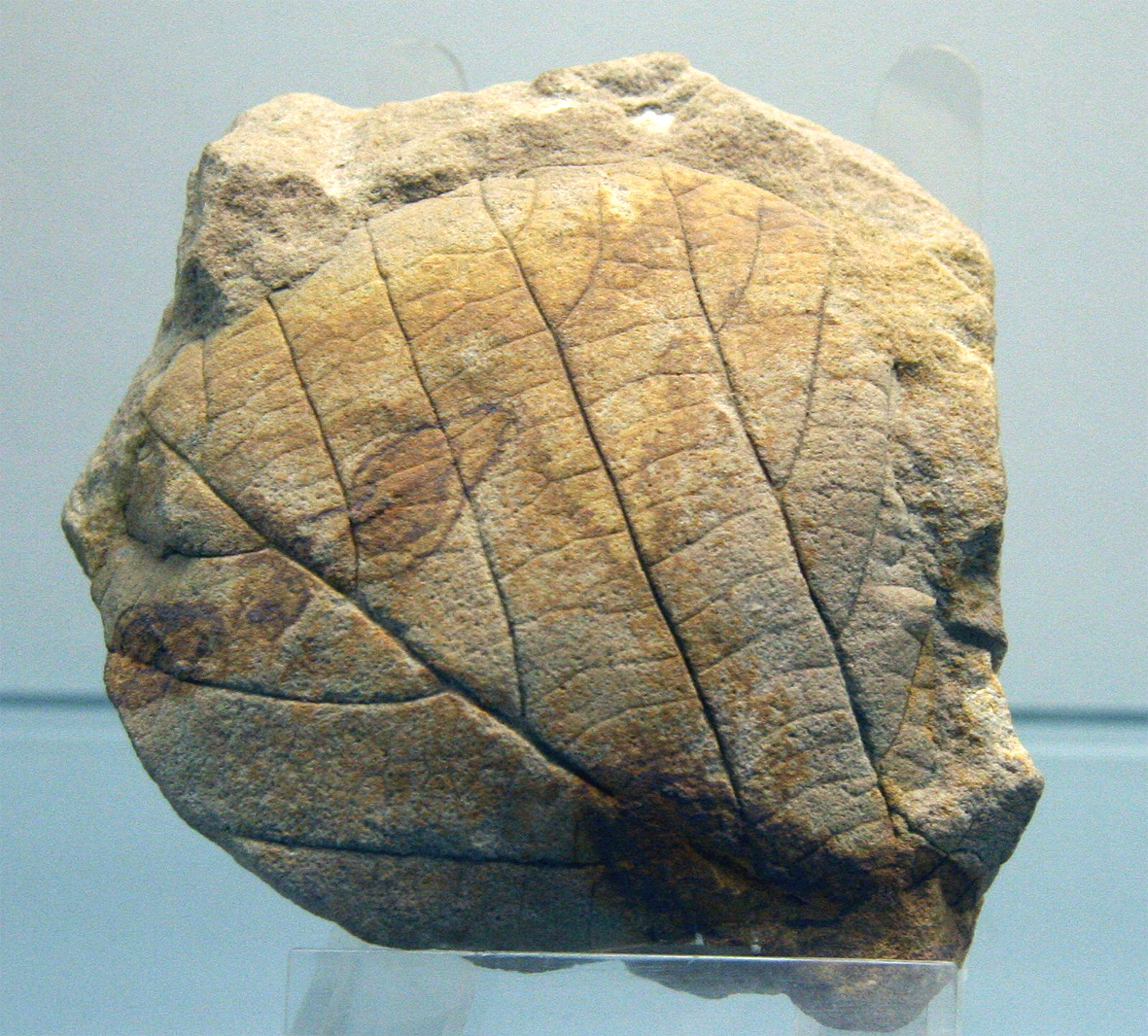
- Credneria triacuminata leaf

Scientific classification
- Kingdom: Plantae
- Clade: Tracheophytes
- Clade: Angiosperms
- Clade: Eudicots
- Order: Proteales
- Family: Platanaceae
- Genus: †Credneria; Zenker

= Credneria =

Credneria Temporal range: Cretaceous

Extinct genus of flowering plants

Credneria is an extinct genus in the family or Platanaceae of broad-leaf trees similar to extinct Platanus species that appeared during the Cretaceous. The genus was first described by Zenker (1833) and has formerly been placed in the family Salicaceae rather than Platanaceae on occasion. Credneria leaves are preserved in sandstone and less often in siltstone. The leaves are typically obovate with a pinnate-actinodromous venation and distinct suprabasal veins.

== Species ==
Known species are:

- Credneria biloba
- Credneria bohemica
- Credneria comparabilis
- Credneria cuneifolia
- Credneria daturaefolia (Ward)
- Credneria denticulata
- ?Credneria grewiopsoides
- Credneria integerrima
- ?Credneria longifolia
- Credneria pachyphylla
- Credneria parva
- Credneria prophylloides (Knowlton)
- Credneria pulchra
- ?Credneria spatiosa
- Credneria subserrata (Hampe)
- Credneria subtriloba
- Credneria sudanense
- Credneria triacuminata (Hampe)

The species Crednetia basinervosa (Hollick), C. elegans (Hollick), C. inordinata (Hollick), C. intermedia (Hollick), C. mixta(Hollick), and C. truncatodenticulata (Bell) have all been identified as junior synonyms of the platanaceous species Pseudoprotophyllum boreale. The species Credneria grewiopsoides (Hollick), C. longifolia (Hollick) and C. spatiosa (Hollick) from the Cenomanian Melozi and Kaltag formations along the Yukon River in Alaska are also possibly representatives of Pseudoprotophyllum boreale, but the known fossil material for the species was considered too incomplete to make a determination.
