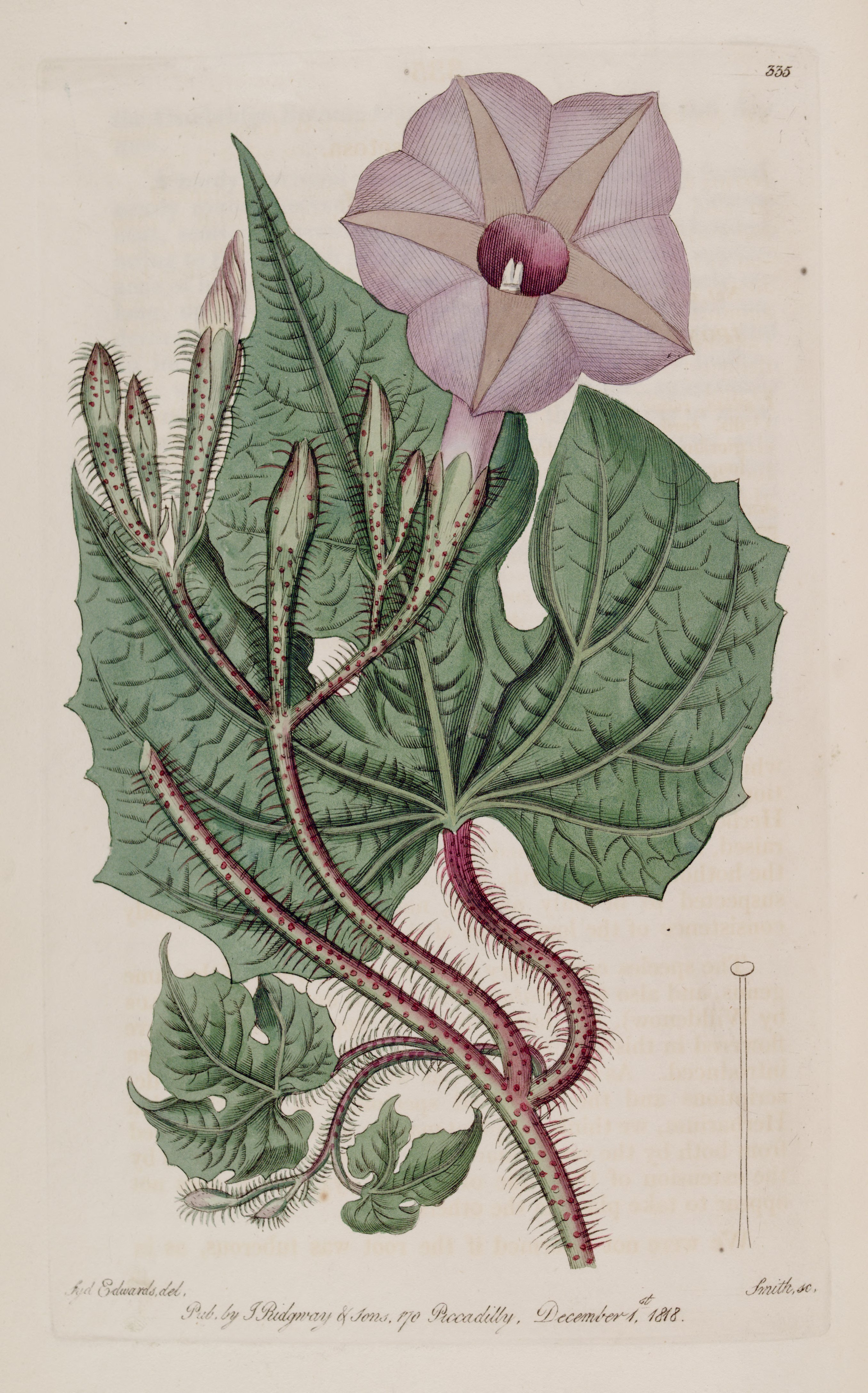

Scientific classification
- Kingdom: Plantae
- Clade: Tracheophytes
- Clade: Angiosperms
- Clade: Eudicots
- Clade: Asterids
- Order: Solanales
- Family: Convolvulaceae
- Genus: Ipomoea
- Species: I. setosa

Binomial name
- Ipomoea setosa Ker Gawl.

Subspecies
- Ipomoea setosa subsp. melanotricha (Brandegee) J.R.I.Wood & Scotland; Ipomoea setosa subsp. pavonii (Hallier f.) J.R.I.Wood & Scotland; Ipomoea setosa subsp. sepacuitensis (Donn.Sm.) J.R.I.Wood & Scotland; Ipomoea setosa subsp. setosa

Synonyms
- Batatas setosa (Ker Gawl.) Lindl.; Calonyction setosum (Ker Gawl.) Hallier f.; Convolvulus setosus (Ker Gawl.) Spreng.; Modesta setosa (Ker Gawl.) Raf.

= Ipomoea setosa =

Species of plant

Ipomoea setosa, the Brazilian morning-glory, is a species of flowering plant in the family Convolvulaceae. Its range is larger than its common name suggests and is native to Argentina, Belize, Bolivia, Brazil South, Brazil, Costa Rica, Ecuador, El Salvador, Guatemala, Honduras, Mexico, Nicaragua, Panama, Peru, and Venezuela, and has been introduced to China, and the United States.

== Cultivation and description ==
Like many species of Ipomoea, this plant is cultivated for its flower blooms. It is a climbing herbaceous tree that grows in a seasonally dry tropical biome, and has four accepted infraspecific named variations. The seeds of this plant have an oval shape and have filamentous margins.

== Chemistry ==
As with many species of Ipomoea, I. setosa reportedly has alkaloids that make consuming the plant unpleasant for herbivores. It is not grown for consumption but for aesthetics.
