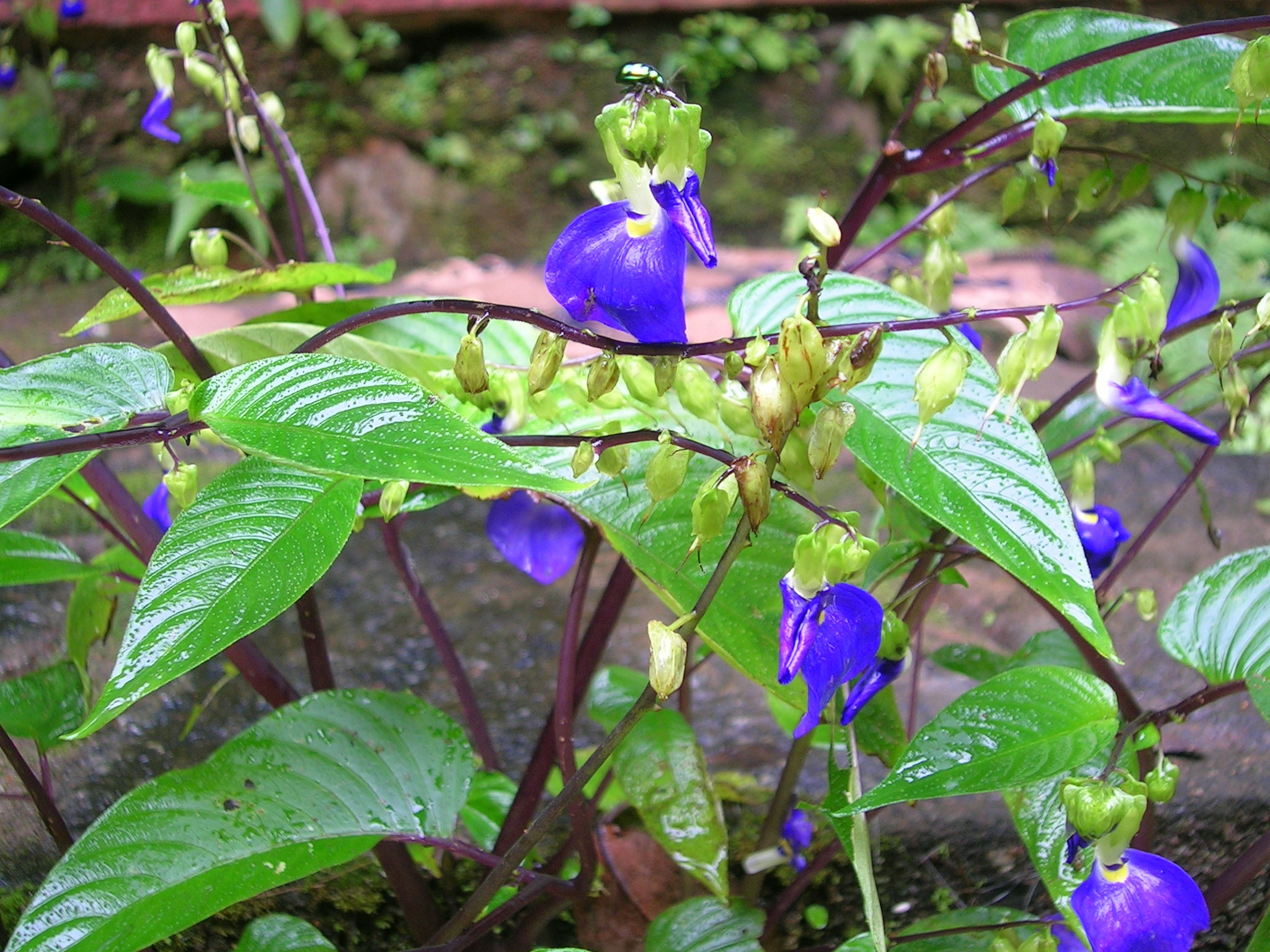
- South Indian Klugia

Scientific classification
- Kingdom: Plantae
- Clade: Tracheophytes
- Clade: Angiosperms
- Clade: Eudicots
- Clade: Asterids
- Order: Lamiales
- Family: Gesneriaceae
- Genus: Rhynchoglossum
- Species: R. notonianum

Binomial name
- Rhynchoglossum notonianum (Wall.) B.L. Burtt

Synonyms
- Wulfenia notoniana Wall.

= Rhynchoglossum notonianum =

Species of plant

Rhynchoglossum notonianum, the South-Indian tongue-lip, is an annual succulent herb plant in family Gesneriaceae, native to South India and Sri Lanka. It is characterized by a creeping growth habit and is covered with fine hairs, which on the stem are mostly confined to a single line on one side.

The leaves are alternately arranged, stalked, and either entire or slightly serrated along the margins. The bases of the leaves are unequally heart-shaped. Flowers are borne in racemes opposite the leaves and are notable for their rich, deep blue color, with all flowers oriented downward.

The calyx is five-cleft and five-angled, with the angles often appearing winged. The flowers, which are typically over 2.5 cm (1 inch) long, are distinctly two-lipped. The upper lip is small and two-toothed, while the lower lip is much larger, broad, and elliptic, bearing two cavities near the base. The plant has four stamens, and the ovary is enclosed in a fleshy cup.

Flowering occurs between August and November. This species occurs throughout Kerala, particularly in moist, shaded locations. It is also found in the Western Ghats and in Sri Lanka.
