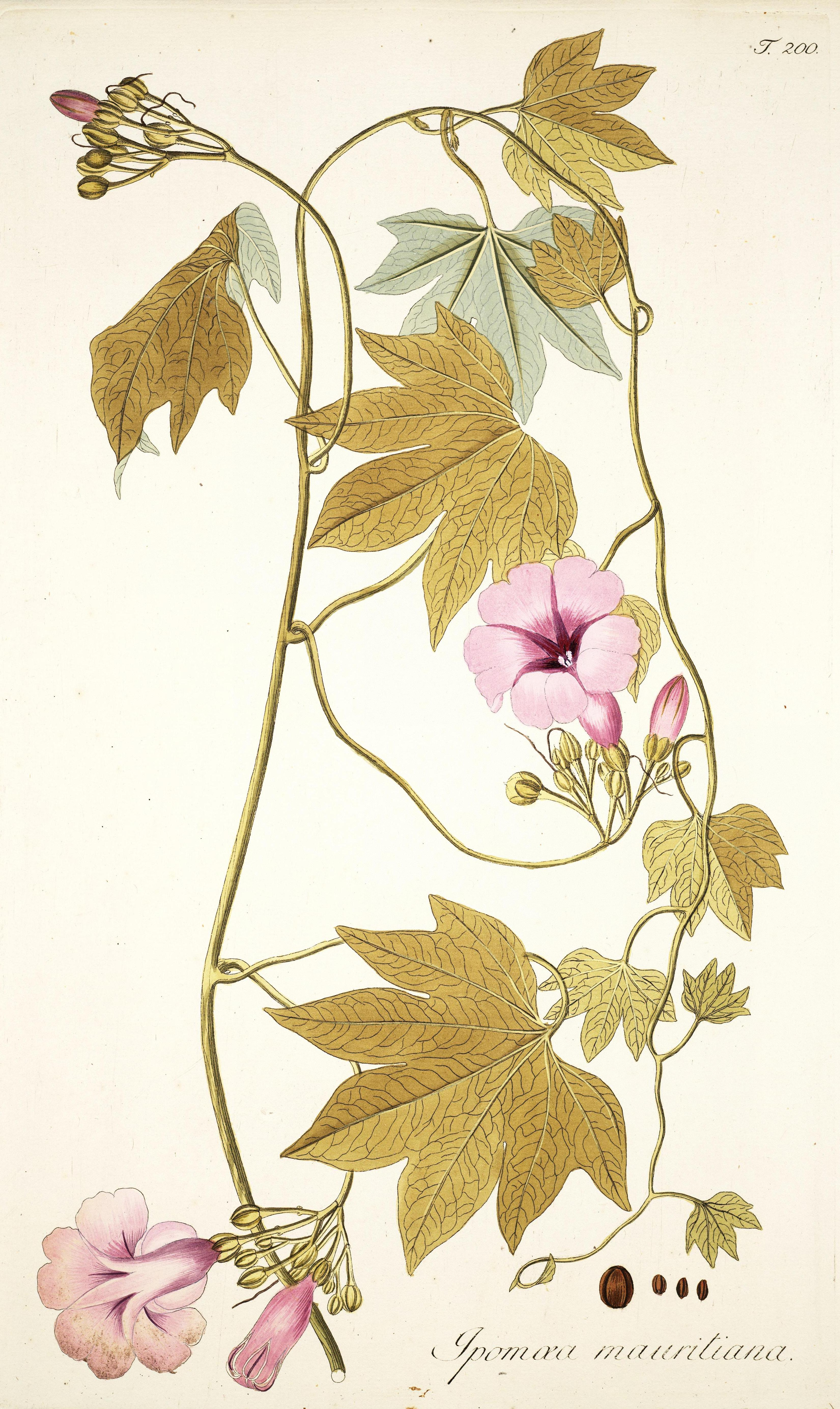

Scientific classification
- Kingdom: Plantae
- Clade: Tracheophytes
- Clade: Angiosperms
- Clade: Eudicots
- Clade: Asterids
- Order: Solanales
- Family: Convolvulaceae
- Genus: Ipomoea
- Species: I. mauritiana

Binomial name
- Ipomoea mauritiana Jacq.

Synonyms
- Convolvulus paniculatus Ipomoea digitata Ipomoea eriosperma Ipomoea paniculata

= Ipomoea mauritiana =

Species of flowering plant

Ipomoea mauritiana is a type of morning glory plant. Like the sweet potato, it belongs to the genus Ipomoea. It grows as a vine.

Its origins are uncertain, but it has been recorded in West Africa, including in Gambia and the riparian forests of Benin, as well as Australia's Northern Territory. It is naturalised in many parts of the world, including Taiwan.

Specimens have been collected or observations taken in Australia, Belize, Benin, Brunei, Cambodia, Cameroon, China, Colombia, DRC, Costa Rica, Côte d'Ivoire, Ecuador, Equatorial Guinea, Gabon, Ghana, Guinea, Honduras, Indonesia, Laos, Liberia, Madagascar, Mauritius, Micronesia, Federated States of Myanmar, New Caledonia, Nicaragua, Nigeria, Panama, Papua New Guinea, Peru, Senegal, Sudan, Tanzania, Thailand, Togo and Venezuela.

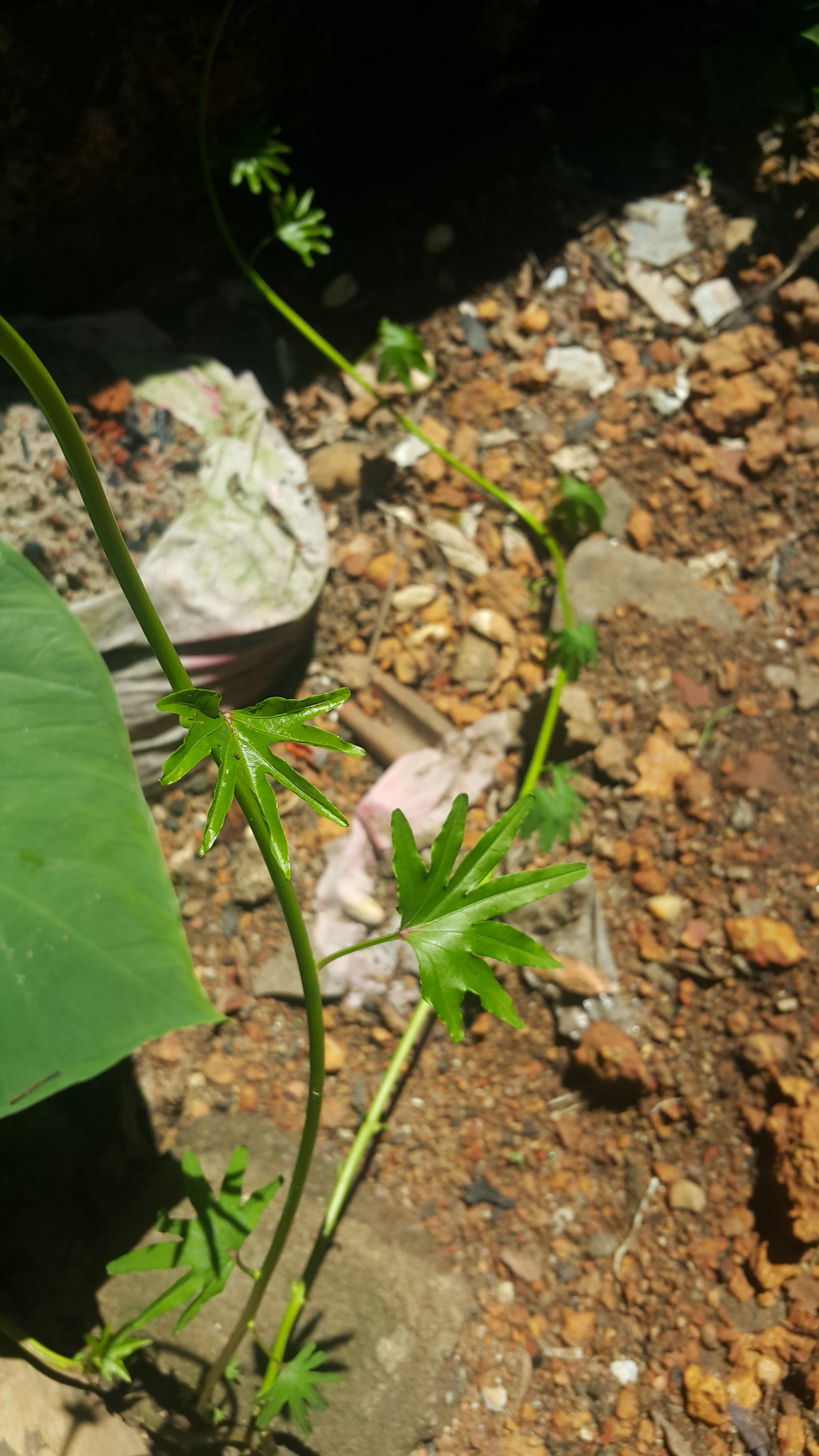
