= Christian Eduard Langethal =

German botanist and agronomist (1806–1878)

Christian Eduard Langethal (6 January 1806, Erfurt – 28 July 1878, Jena) was a German botanist and agronomist. He is known for his writings involving agricultural botany and agricultural history. The standard author abbreviation Langeth. is used to indicate this person as the author when citing a botanical name.

Beginning in 1827 he studied natural sciences at the University of Jena. During the winter term of 1834/35 he began teaching classes in natural history at the recently built scientific academy at Eldena (near Greifswald), where he worked closely with his former teacher, Friedrich Gottlob Schulze (1795–1860). In 1839, with Schulze, he returned to the University of Jena as an associate professor of botany. At Jena he distinguished himself in studies of botany as it applied to agricultural science.

== Principal writings ==
- Lehrbuch der landwirtschaftlichen Pflanzenkunde (1841–1845, 3 volumes; fifth edition 1874–76, 4 volumes) - Manual of agricultural botany.
- Geschichte der deutschen Landwirthschaft (Jena 1847–1856, 4 volumes) - History of German agriculture.
- Beschreibung der Gewächse Deutschlands nach ihren natürlichen Familien und ihrer Bedeutung für die Landwirtschaft (Jena 1858, second edition 1868) - Description of plants in Germany according to their natural families and their importance in agriculture.

With Diederich Franz Leonhard von Schlechtendal and Ernst Schenk, he continued Jonathan Carl Zenker's Flora von Thüringen: Und den angrenzenden Provinzen (1830–1855, 145 issues).
