= Friedrich Gottlob Schulze =

German economist

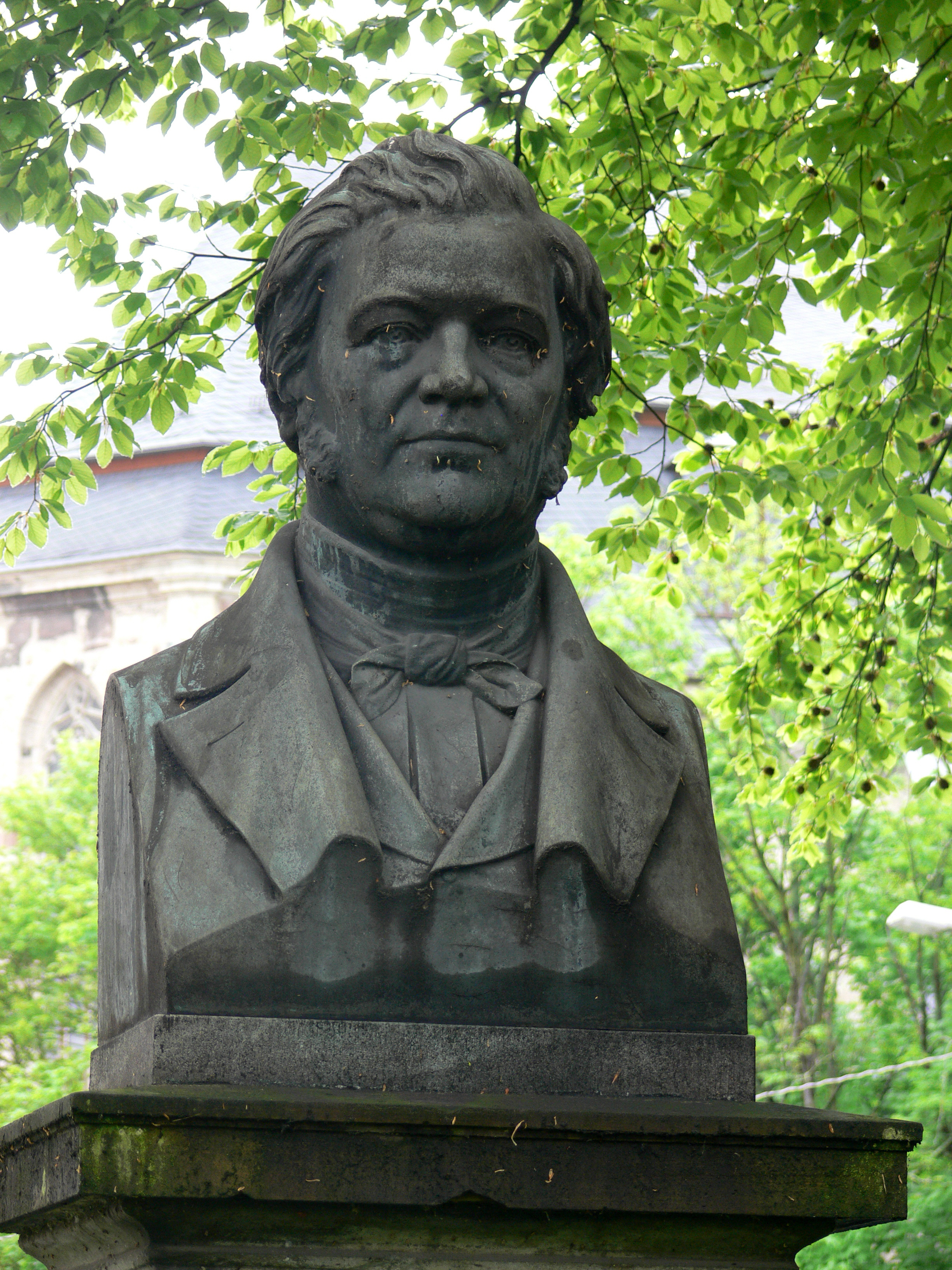
- Friedrich Gottlob Schulze memorial at the Fürstengraben in Jena
- Born: 28 January 1795; Obergävernitz near Meissen, Electorate of Saxony
- Died: 3 July 1860 (aged 65); Jena, Saxe-Weimar-Eisenach

Friedrich Gottlob Schulze (German: [ˈʃʊltsə]; 28 January 1795 – 3 July 1860) was a German economist.

== Biography ==
He was born in Obergävernitz (near Meissen) and hence called Schulze-Gävernitz. He was educated at Leipzig and Jena, becoming professor at the latter university in 1821, and founding there an agricultural institute, the first connected with a German university. In 1832, he went to Greifswald, where he established a similar training school in Eldena in 1834. These institutions exercised great influence throughout Germany. In 1839 he returned to Jena, where a memorial to him was erected in 1867.

Schulze wrote Deutsche Blätter für Landwirtschaft und Nationalökonomie (1843–59), Nationalökonomie oder Volkswirtschaftslehre (1856), and the posthumous Lehrbuch der allgemeinen Landwirtschaft (1863).
