= Parasitology Research =

- Discipline: parasitology
- Language: English (earlier: German)
- Edited by: Una M. Ryan, Julia Walochnik (editors in chief)

Publication details
- Former name(s): Zeitschrift für Parasitenkunde
- History: first issue in 1928
- Publisher: Springer (Germany)
- Open access: no
- Impact factor: 2.289 (2020)

Standard abbreviations
- ISO 4: Parasitol. Res.

Indexing
- ISSN: 0932-0113 (print); 1432-1955 (web)

Links
- Journal homepage

Parasitology Research, formerly known as Zeitschrift für Parasitenkunde (German for Journal for Parasite Study) is a journal founded by Albrecht Hase (born March 16, 1882, died November 20, 1962), a German entomologist and parasitologist. From its inception in 1928 until 1961, he was co-publisher and editor-in-chief of the journal.
