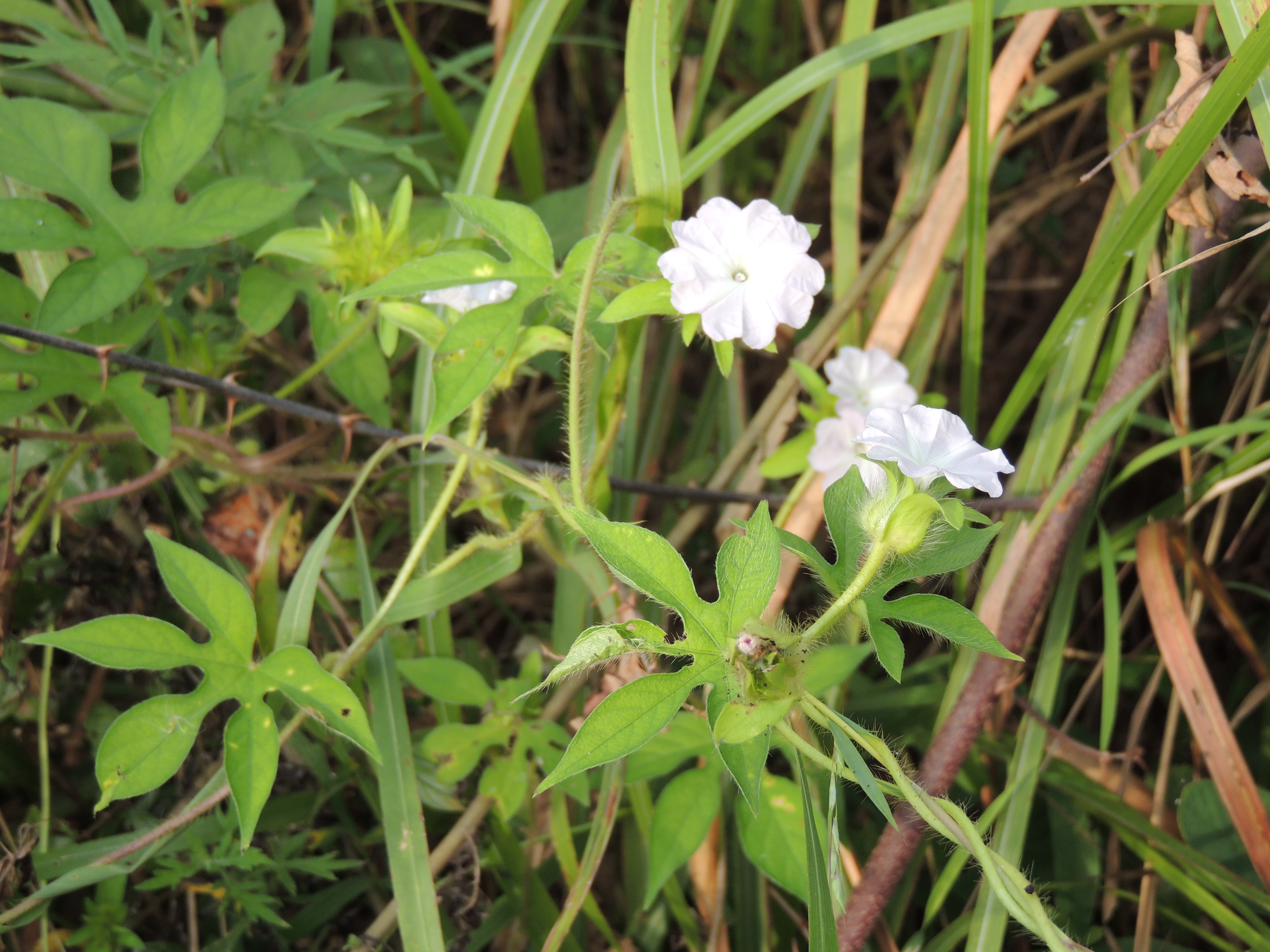
- Ipomoea pes-tigridis, the type species of the genus

Scientific classification
- Kingdom: Plantae
- Clade: Tracheophytes
- Clade: Angiosperms
- Clade: Eudicots
- Clade: Asterids
- Order: Solanales
- Family: Convolvulaceae
- Tribe: Ipomoeeae
- Genus: Ipomoea; L.

Type species
- Ipomoea pes-tigridis L.

Species
- More than 600, see list

Synonyms
- List: Acmostemon Pilg.; Adamboe Raf.; Amphione Raf.; Apopleumon Raf.; Batatas Choisy; Bombycospermum J.Presl; Bonanox Raf.; Calboa Cav.; Calonyction Choisy; Calycanthemum Klotzsch; Cleiemera Raf.; Cleiostoma Raf.; Clitocyamos St.-Lag.; Coiladena Raf.; Convolvuloides Moench; Decaloba Raf.; Diatrema Raf.; Diatremis Raf.; Dimerodiscus Gagnep.; Doxema Raf.; Elythrostamna Bojer ex Desjardins; Euryloma Raf.; Exallosis Raf.; Exocroa Raf.; Exogonium Choisy; Fraxima Raf.; Gynoisa Raf.; Isypus Raf.; Kolofonia Raf.; Lariospermum Raf.; Latrienda Raf.; Legendrea Webb & Berthel.; Leptocallis G.Don; Macrostemma Pers.; Marcellia Mart. ex Choisy; Melascus Raf.; Milhania Neck.; Mina Cerv.; Modesta Raf.; Morenoa La Llave; Navipomoea (Roberty) Roberty; Neorthosis Raf.; Nil Medik.; Ornithosperma Raf.; Parasitipomoea Hayata; Pentacrostigma K.Afzel.; Pharbitis Choisy; Plesiagopus Raf.; Quamoclit Mill.; Quamoclita Raf.; Quamoclitia Raf.; Saccia Naudin; Stomadena Raf.; Tereietra Raf.; Tirtalia Raf.; Tremasperma Raf.; Turbina Raf.

= Ipomoea =

Genus of flowering plants

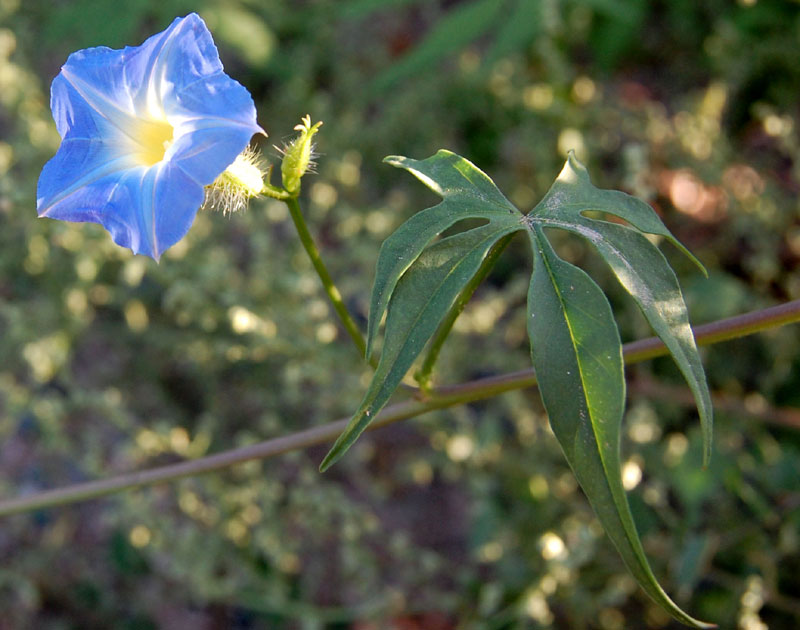
Flower and leaf of Ipomoea barbatisepala

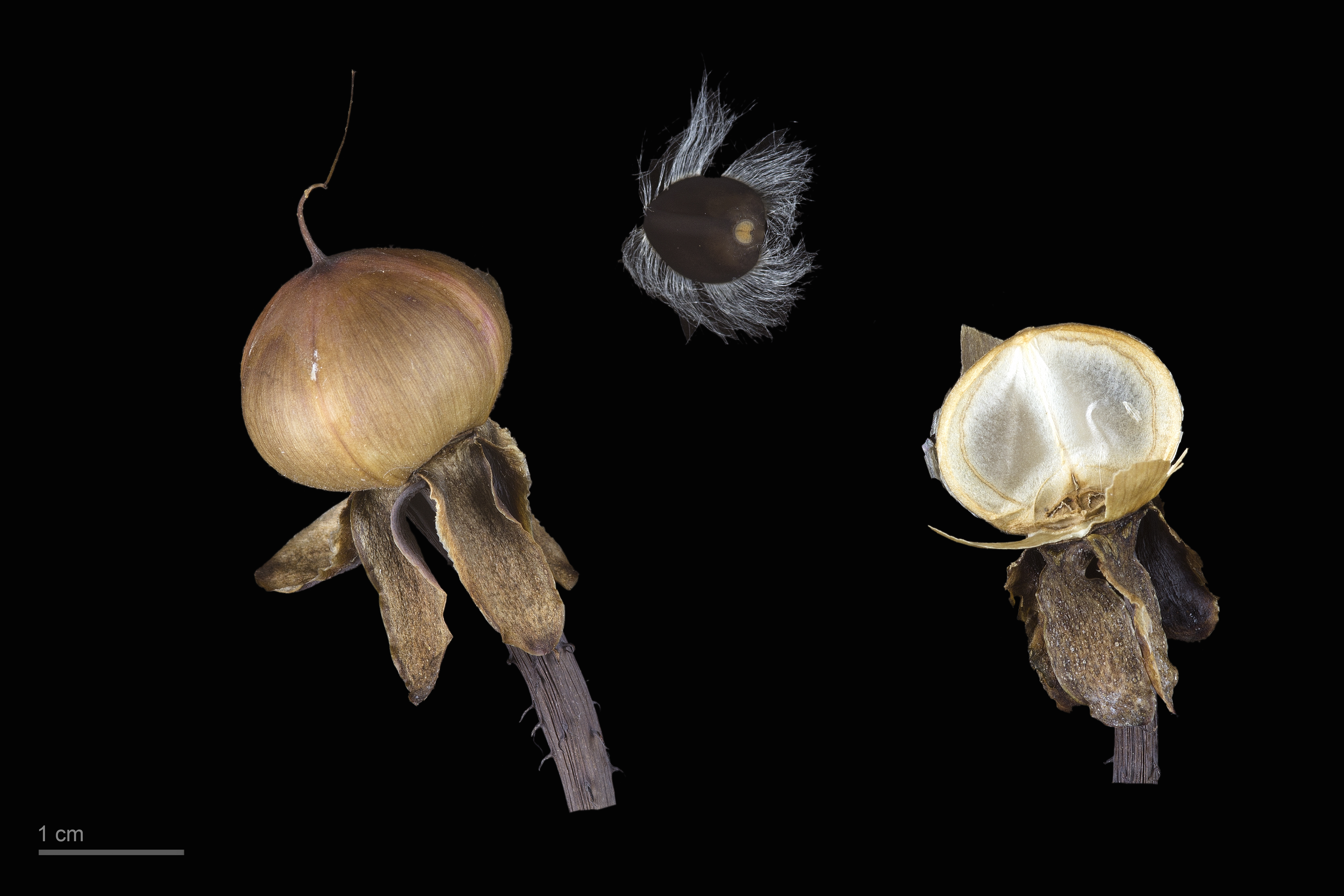
Fruit and seed of Ipomoea setosa

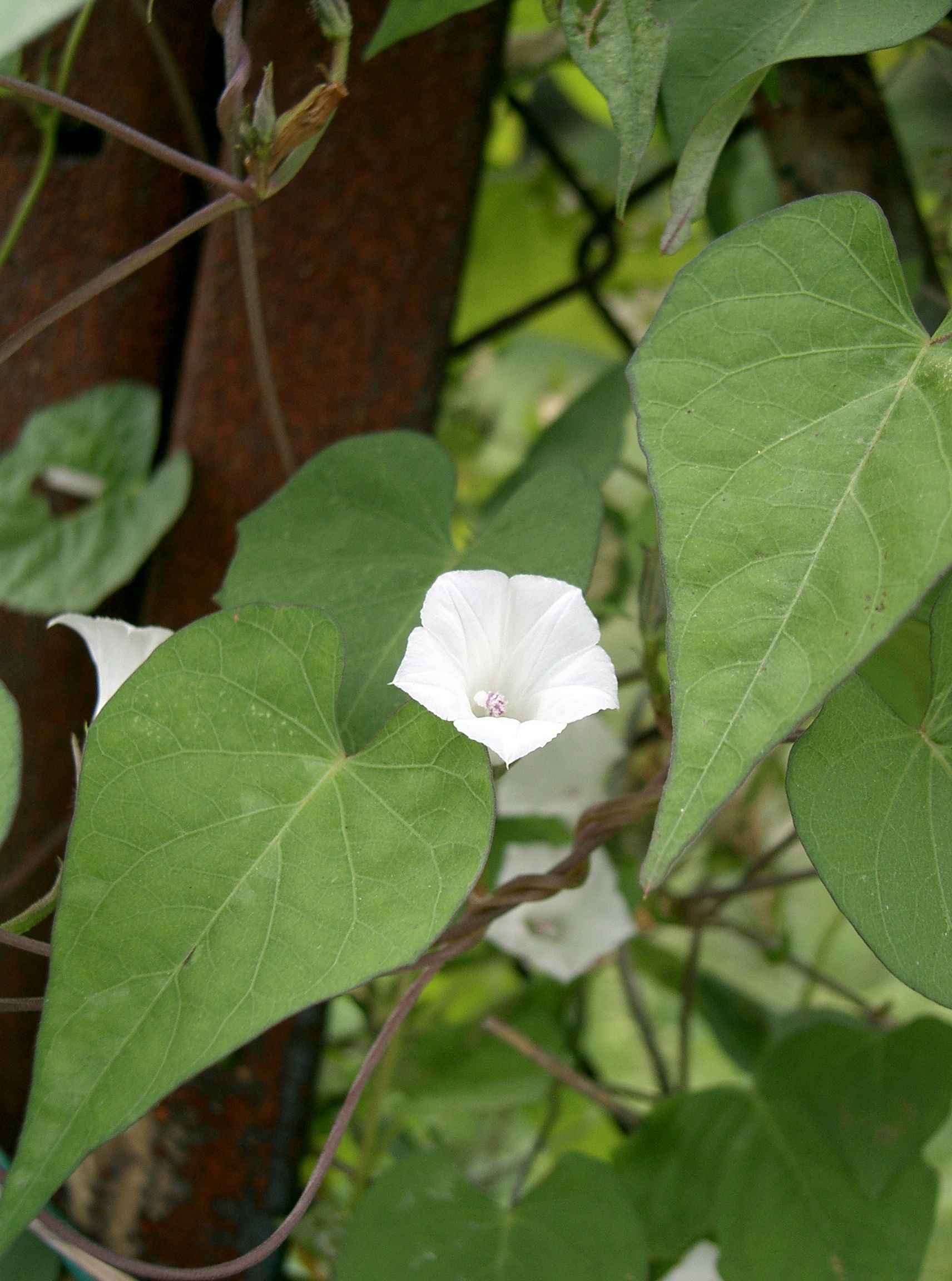
Whitestar potato Ipomoea lacunosa

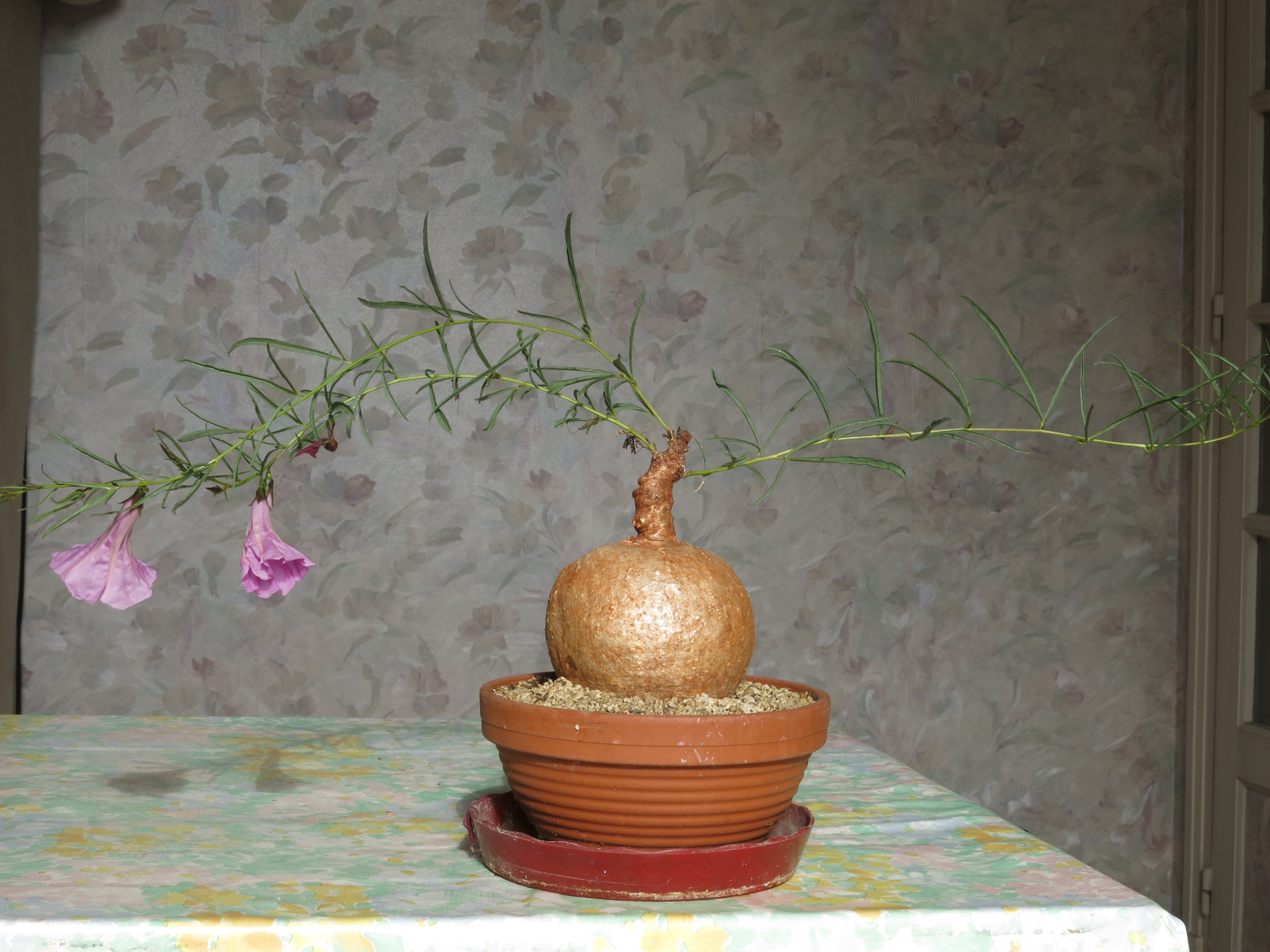
Flowering Ipomoea holubii with a thick caudex

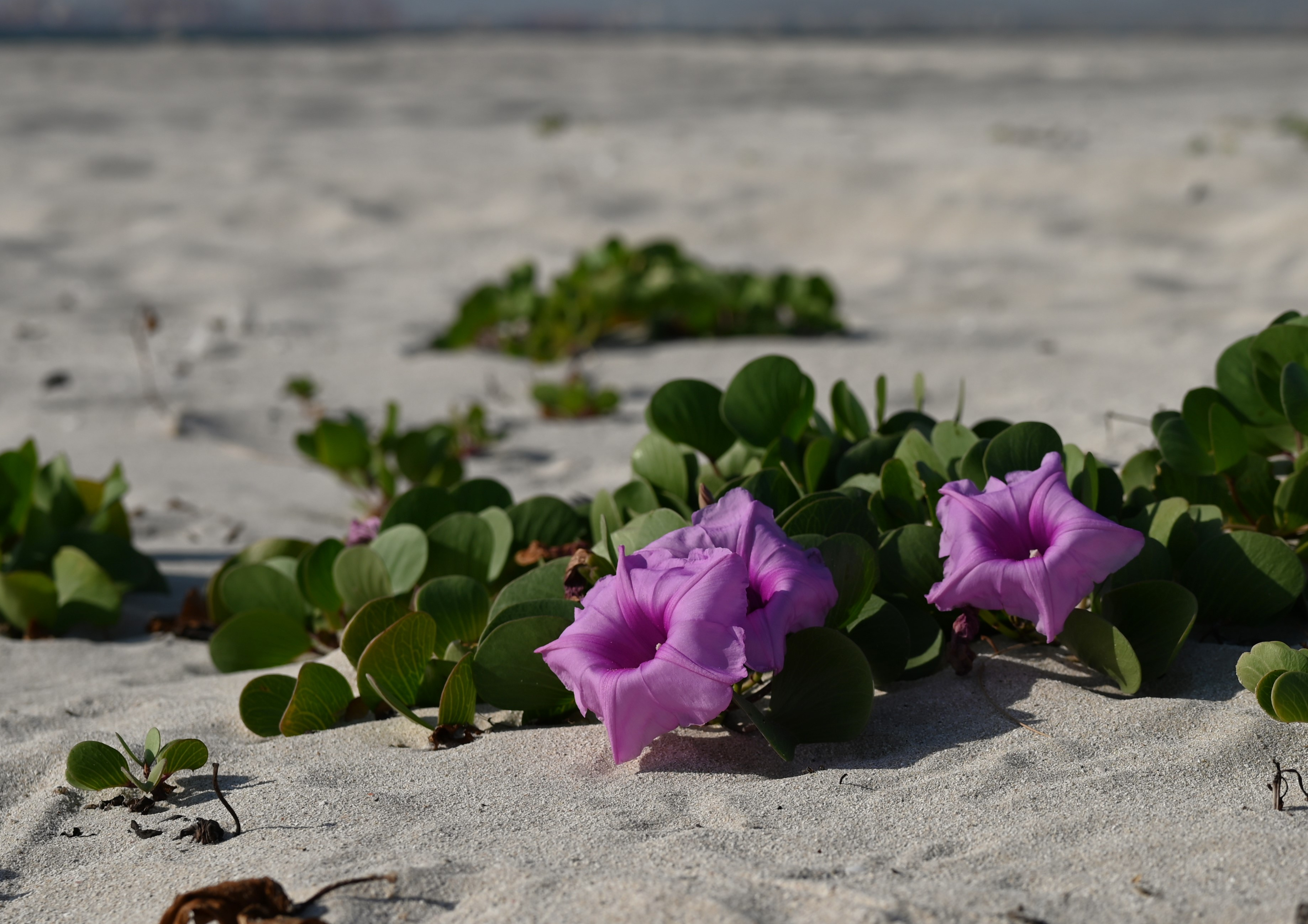
Ipomoea pes-caprae growing in sand in Oman

Ipomoea (/ˌɪpəˈmiː.ə, -oʊ-/) is the largest genus in the plant family Convolvulaceae, with over 600 species. It is a large and diverse group, with common names including morning glory, water Convolvulus or water spinach, sweet potato, bindweed, moonflower, etc. The genus occurs throughout the tropical and subtropical regions of the world, and comprises annual and perennial herbaceous plants, lianas, shrubs, and small trees; most of the species are twining climbing plants.

== Description ==
=== Vegetative characteristics ===
Ipomoea are annual or perennial twining, prostrate or erect, herbs, shrubs, lianas, or trees usually with twining or trailing stems bearing simple, or rarely compound leaves.

=== Generative characteristics ===
The few- to many-flowered, axillary, solitary or cymose inflorescences bear small to large, blue, red, pink, purple, white, orange, or yellow, pentamerous flowers.

== Taxonomy ==
The genus Ipomoea L. was described by Carl Linnaeus in 1753. It has 642 accepted species. The type species is Ipomoea pes-tigridis L. Within the family Convolvulaceae, it is placed in the tribe Ipomoeeae.

=== Common names ===
Their most widespread common name is morning glory, but some species in related genera bear that same common name and some Ipomoea species are known by different common names. Those formerly separated in Calonyction (Greek καλός kalós "good" and νύξ, νυκτός núx, nuktós, "night") are called moonflowers.

=== Etymology ===
The name Ipomoea is derived from the Ancient Greek ἴψ, meaning 'woodworm', and ὅμοιος (hómoios), meaning "resembling". It refers to their twining habit.

== Ecology ==
=== Pollination ===
The species of Ipomoea interfere with each other's pollination. Pollen from different species compete in each other's reproductive processes, imposing a fitness cost.

== Uses ==
Ipomoea sepiaria is part of the Dashapushpam (Ten sacred flowers) in Kerala and is known as "Thiruthali" in Malayalam.

Moon vine (I. alba) sap was used for vulcanization of the latex of Castilla elastica (Panama rubber tree, Nahuatl: olicuáhuitl) to rubber; as it happens, the rubber tree seems well-suited for the vine to twine upon, and the two species are often found together. As early as 1600 BCE, the Olmecs produced the balls used in the Mesoamerican ballgame.

=== As medicine and entheogen ===
Ergonovine (ergometrine)

Humans use Ipomoea spp. for their content of medical and psychoactive compounds, mainly alkaloids. Some species are renowned for their properties in folk medicine and herbalism; for example, Vera Cruz jalap (I. jalapa) and Tampico jalap (I. simulans) are used to produce jalap, a cathartic preparation accelerating the passage of stool. Kiribadu ala (giant potato, I. mauritiana) is one of the many ingredients of chyawanprash, the ancient Ayurvedic tonic called "the elixir of life" for its wide-ranging properties.

The leaves of I. batatas are eaten as a vegetable, and have been shown to slow oxygenation of LDLs, with some similar potential health benefits to green tea and grape polyphenols.

Other species were and still are used as potentially potent entheogens. Seeds of Mexican morning glory (tlitliltzin, I. tricolor) were thus used by Aztecs and Zapotecs in shamanistic and priestly divination rituals, and at least by the former also as a poison, to give the victim a "horror trip" (see also Aztec entheogenic complex). Beach moonflower (I. violacea) was also used thusly, and the cultivars called 'Heavenly Blue', touted today for their psychoactive properties, seem to represent an indeterminable assembly of hybrids of these two species.

Ergine (D-lysergic acid amide)

Ergoline alkaloids occur in several Ipomoea species whose seeds host heritable Periglandula fungi. Seeds of I. tricolour and I. purpurea commonly contain lysergamides such as ergine (D- lysergic acid amide, LSA) and its epimer isoergine; other reported alkaloids include lysergol, lysergic acid hydroxyethylamide (LSH), and ergometrine (ergonovine)

Human data indicate that LSA produces comparatively mild psychedelic effects with prominent sedation; adverse effects frequently include nausea and vasoconstriction.

Albert Hofmann and colleagues first isolated lysergamides from I. corymbosa and I. violacea seeds and reported early human observations.

Analytical studies of Ipomoea seeds have generally found ergometrine at lower concentrations than LSA, and note that LSH is labile and can rearrange to LSA during extraction or storage.

The subjective effects of morning glory seeds vary with species, alkaloid profile, preparation and dose.

Though most often noted as "recreational" drugs, the lysergamides are also of medical importance.

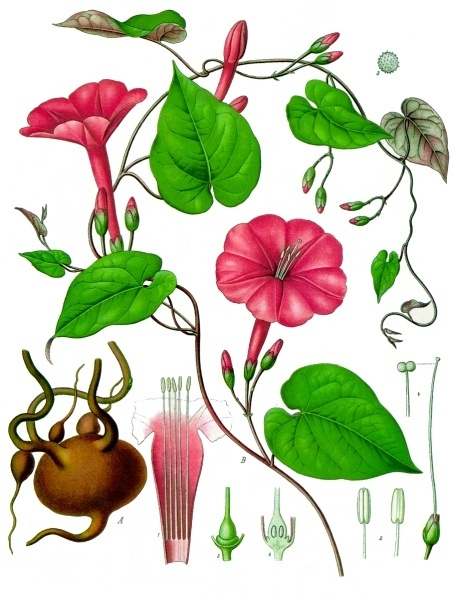
Vera Cruz jalap (I. purga) from Köhler's Medicinal Plants

== Gallery ==
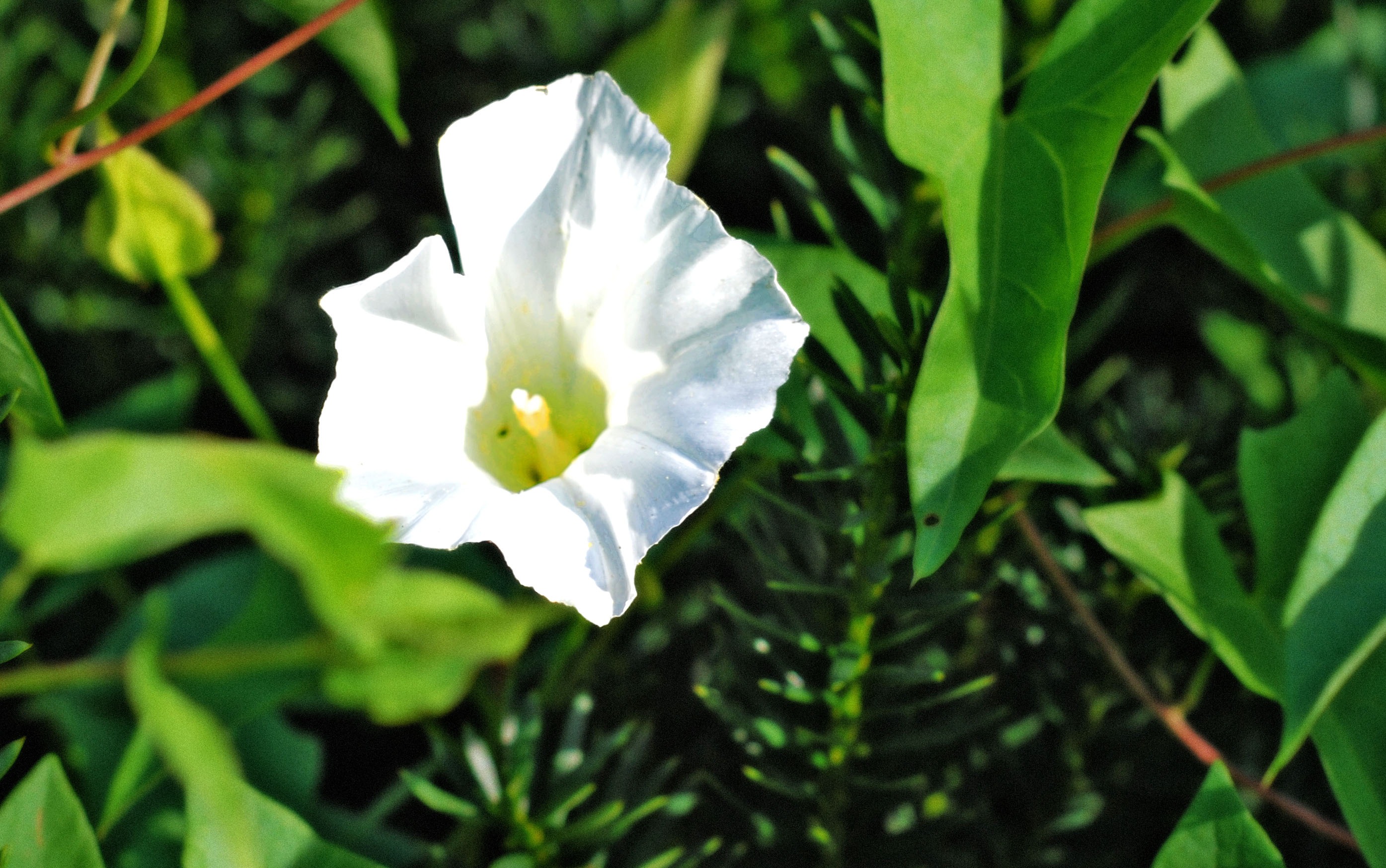
Whitestar potato (I. lacunosa)

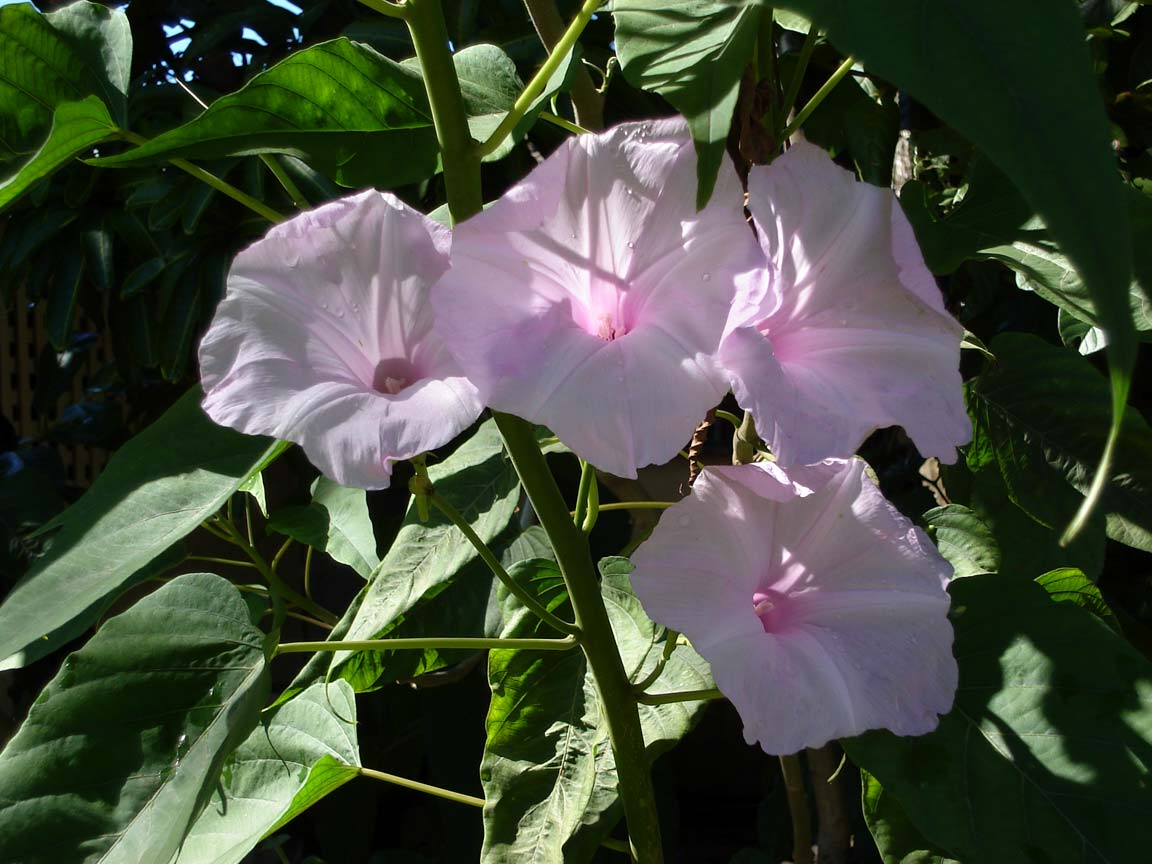
Ipomoea carnea in Brazil

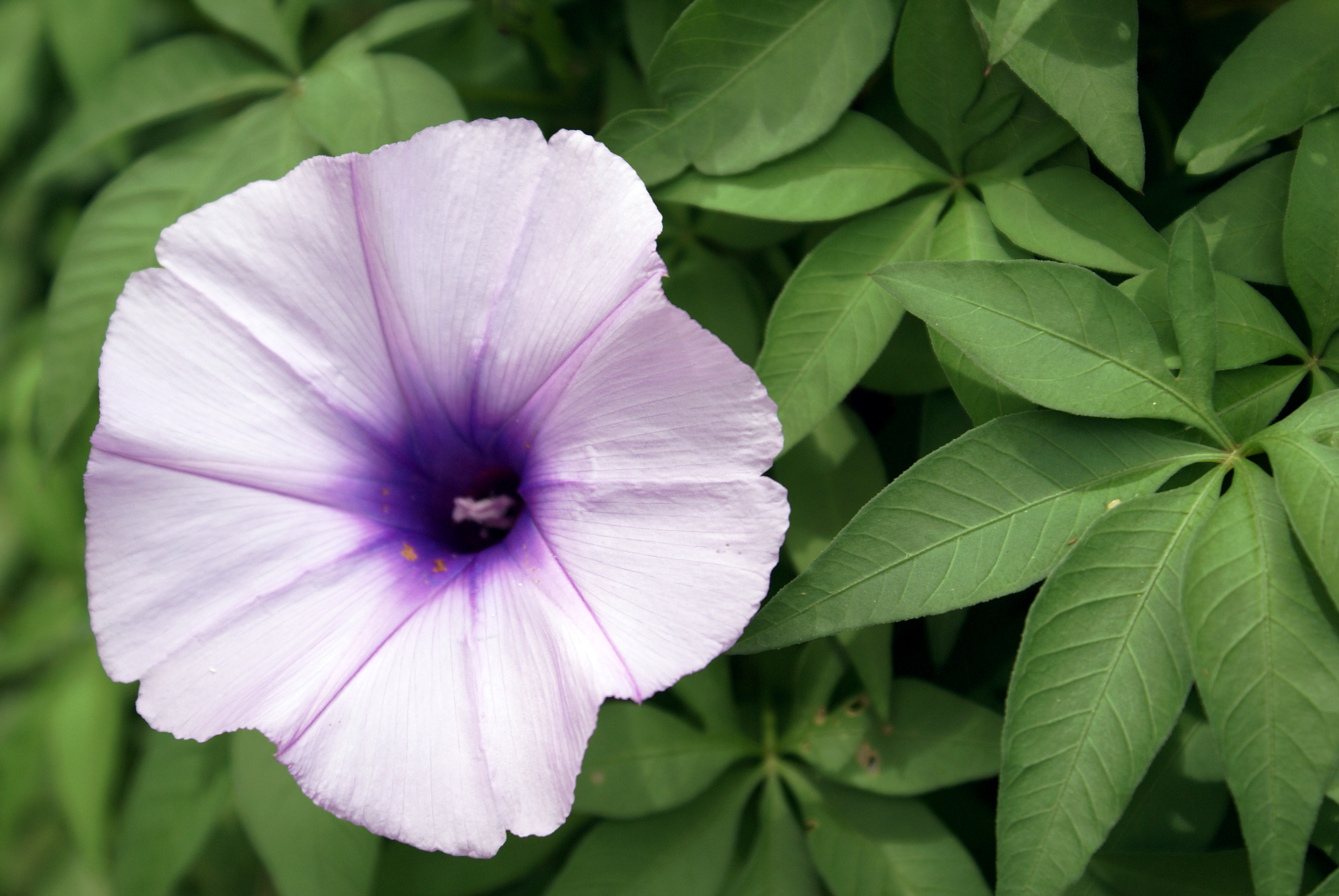
Ipomoea cairica

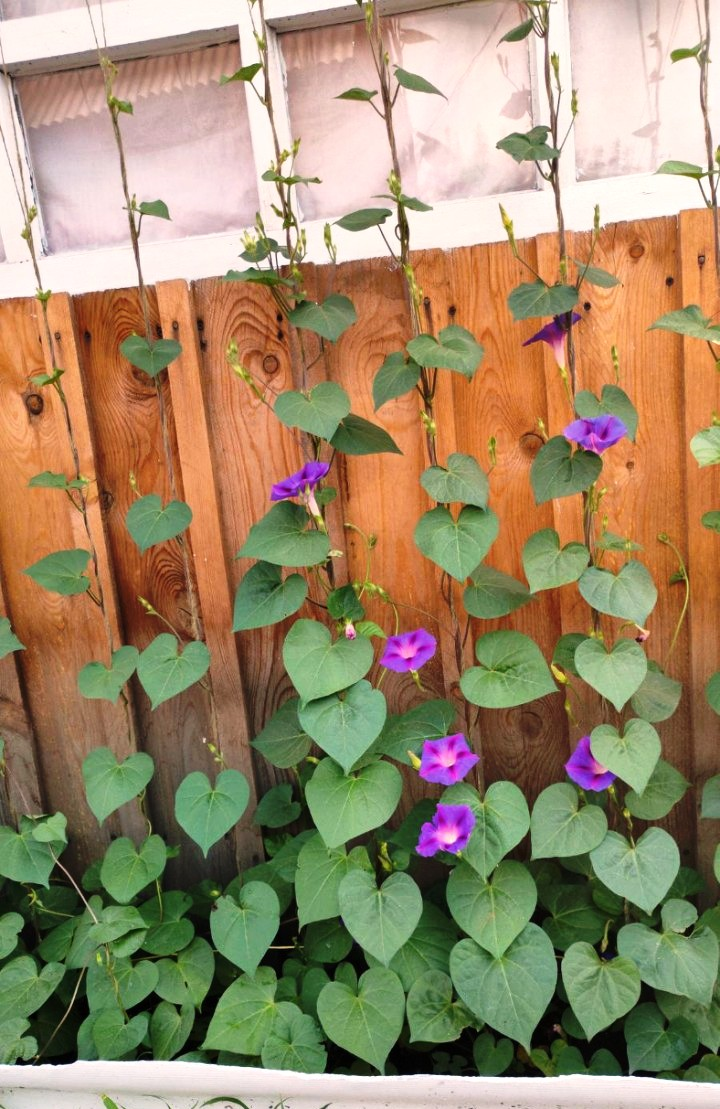
Ipomoea purpurea, Eastern Siberia

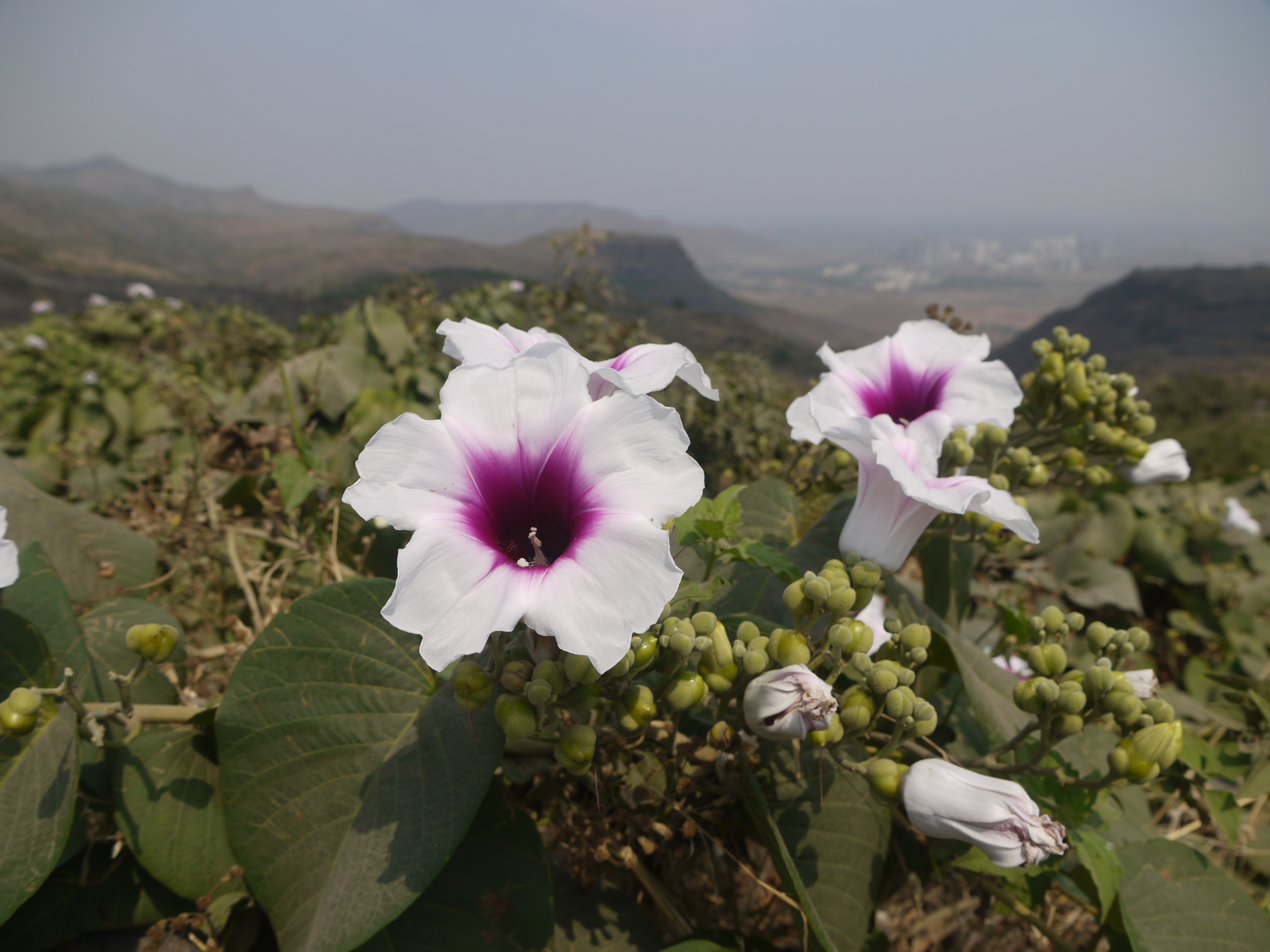
Ipomoea campanulata, India.

== See also ==
- List of Ipomoea species
- Morning glory (drug)
