= Diederich Franz Leonhard von Schlechtendal =

German botanist (1794–1866)

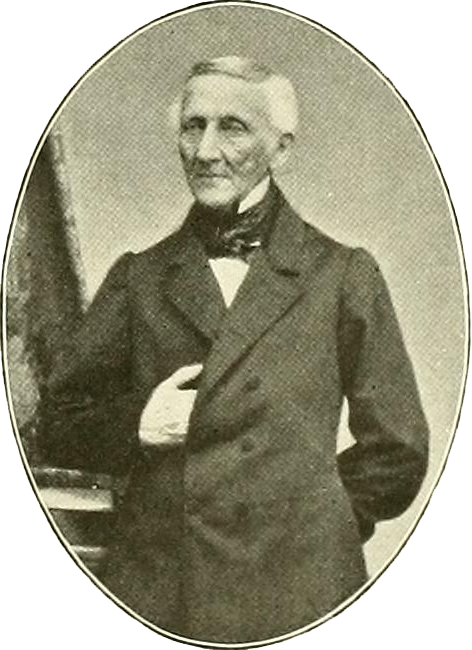
Diederich Franz Leonhard von Schlechtendal (1864)

Diederich Franz Leonhard von Schlechtendal (27 November 1794, Xanten – 12 October 1866, Halle) was a German botanist. The standard author abbreviation Schltdl. is used to indicate this person as the author when citing a botanical name.

== Life and work ==
Von Schlechtendal was born in Xanten am Rhein and when his father Diederich Friedrich Carl von Schlechtendal (1767–1842) became a court judge. His mother Katharina Margarete Schlechtendal, née Bartels died when he was just three. His father lost his job when the French occupied the left bank of the Rhine and the family moved to Berlin. Contact with Carl Willdenow made him interested in botany at an early age. He went to the gymnasium in Berlin and then in a monastery school before joining voluntary military service in Breslau. He was dismissed for being physically unfit and he returned to Berlin to study botany. In 1813 he attended lectures in botany and medicine under Christoph Wilhelm Hufeland (1762–1836), Karl August Berends (1795–1826), and Carl Heinrich Ferdinand von Graefe (1787–1840). He attended the botanical lectures of Johann Heinrich Friedrich Link and also joined excursions with Adelbert von Chamisso (1781–1838). He received a doctorate with a dissertation Animadversiones botanicae in Ranunculeas Candollii in 1819 and became curator of the Royal Herbarium which had just acquired the collections of Willdenow under the direction of Johann Heinrich Friedrich Link. He was also involved in the organization of collections made by Friedrich Sellow (1789–1831), Cape plants from August Gerhard Gottfried Lichtenstein (1780–1851) and lichens of Heinrich Gustav Floerke (1764–1835). In 1827 he became extraordinary professor of botany at Berlin and after the death of Kurt Sprengel he moved to Halle in 1833 where he also became director of the Botanical Gardens at the Martin Luther University of Halle-Wittenberg from 1833 until his death in 1866 from pneumonia.

Schlechtendal married Amalie Henriette Klug (born 1804) daughter of the medical councilor and entomologist Klug. He became the founding editor of the botanical journal Linnaea (from 1826), and with Hugo von Mohl (1805–1872), was publisher of the Botanischen Zeitung (from 1843). He conducted important investigations of the then largely unknown flora of Mexico, carried out in conjunction with Adelbert von Chamisso, and based on specimens collected by Christian Julius Wilhelm Schiede (1798–1836), Carl August Ehrenberg (1801–1849), Friedrich Ernst Leibold (1804–1864), and Ferdinand Deppe (1794–1861).

Schlechtendal was a critic of Darwinism but accepted a limited form of evolution. He advocated a form common descent of "some groups of very similar species, which also inhabit a limited area". He received an honorary doctorate in philosophy from the University of Bonn in 1825, possibly influenced by Christian Gottfried Daniel Nees von Esenbeck.

The genus Schlechtendalia (Asteraceae), from Brazil, Uruguay and Argentina, was named in his honor. His son Eugen von Schlechtendal was involved in aviculture and bird protection.

== Published works ==
- Animadversiones botanicae in Ranunculaceas, Berlin 1819–1820.
- Flora berolinensis, Berlin 1823–1824.
- Adumbrationes plantarum, 1825–1832.
- Flora von Deutschland, Jena 1840–1873 (with Christian Eduard Langethal and Ernst Schenk; fifth edition by Ernst Hallier 1880–1887).
- Hortus halensis, Halle 1841–1853.
