= List of Ipomoea species =

This is a list of the 644 accepted species in the genus Ipomoea.

== Ipomoea species ==
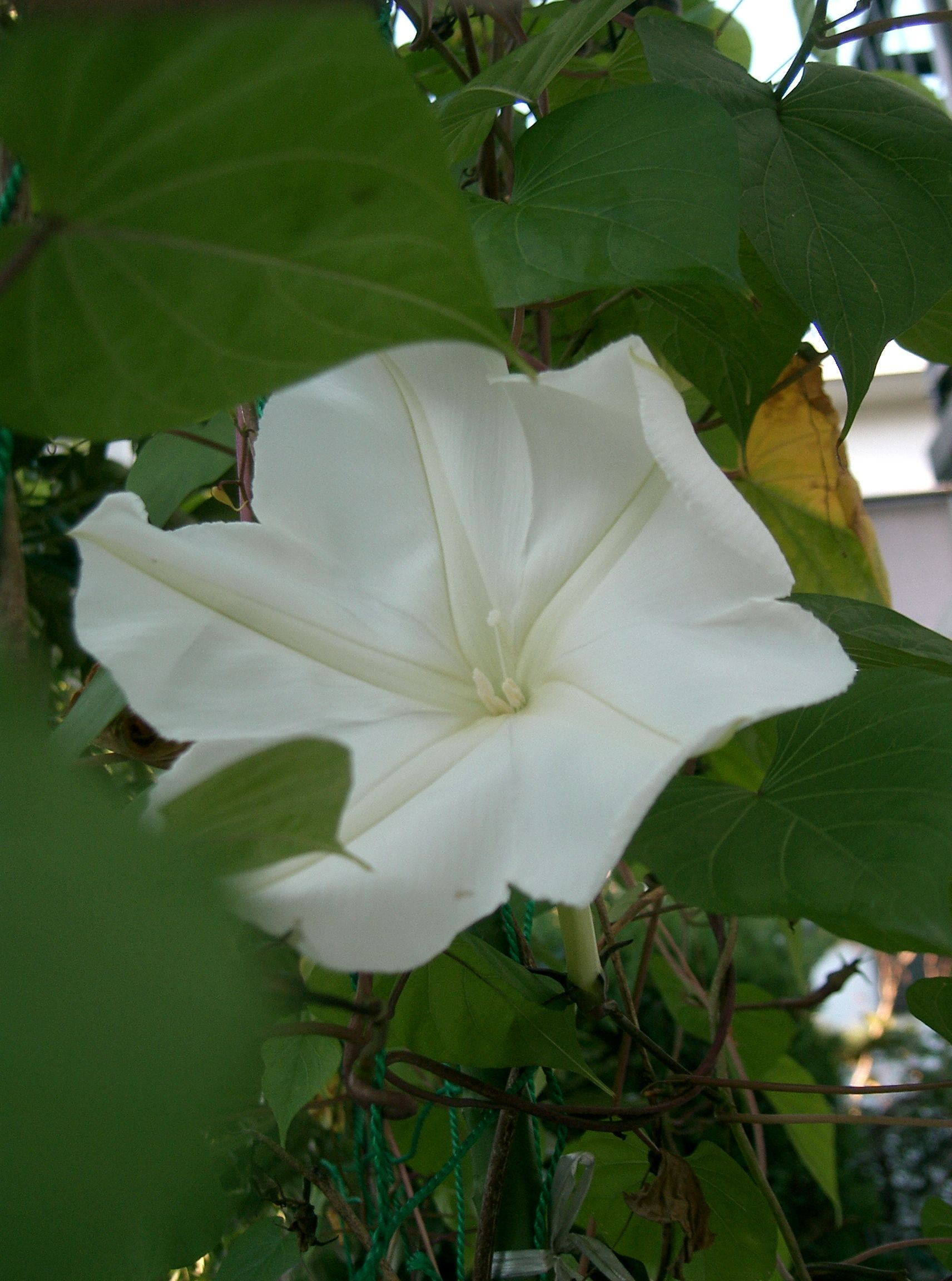
Ipomoea alba

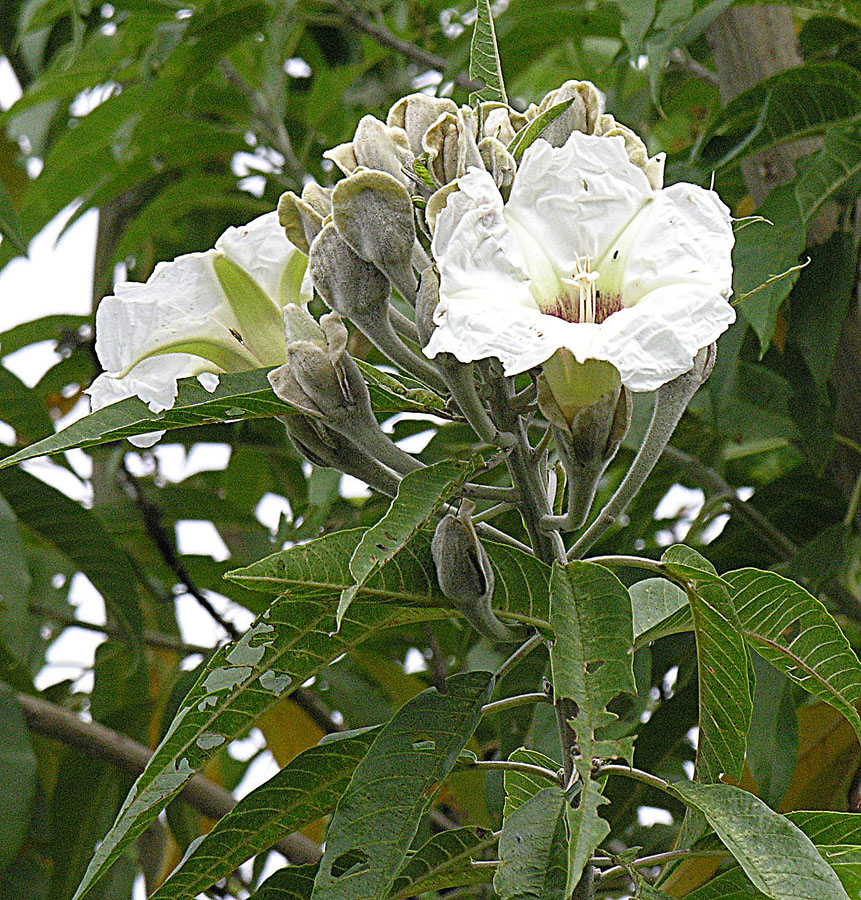
Ipomoea arborescens

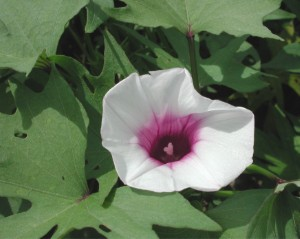
Ipomoea batatas

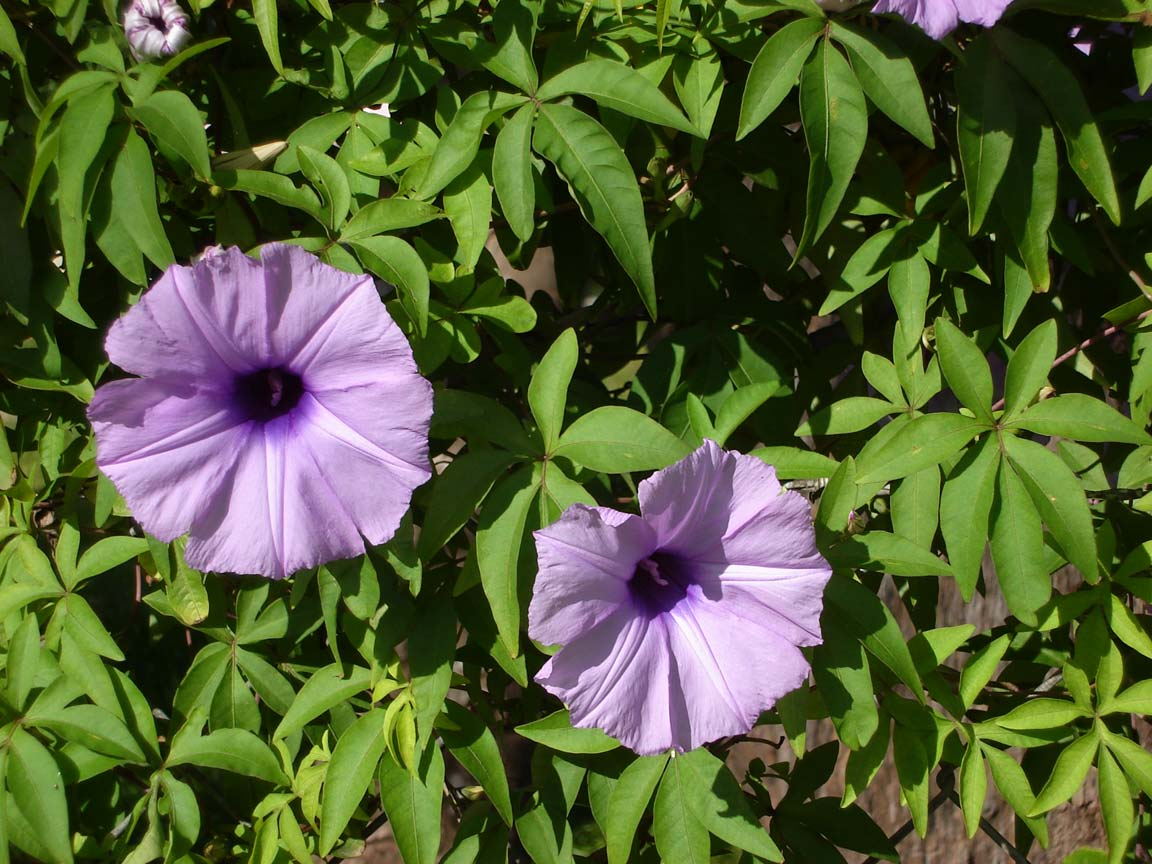
Ipomoea cairica

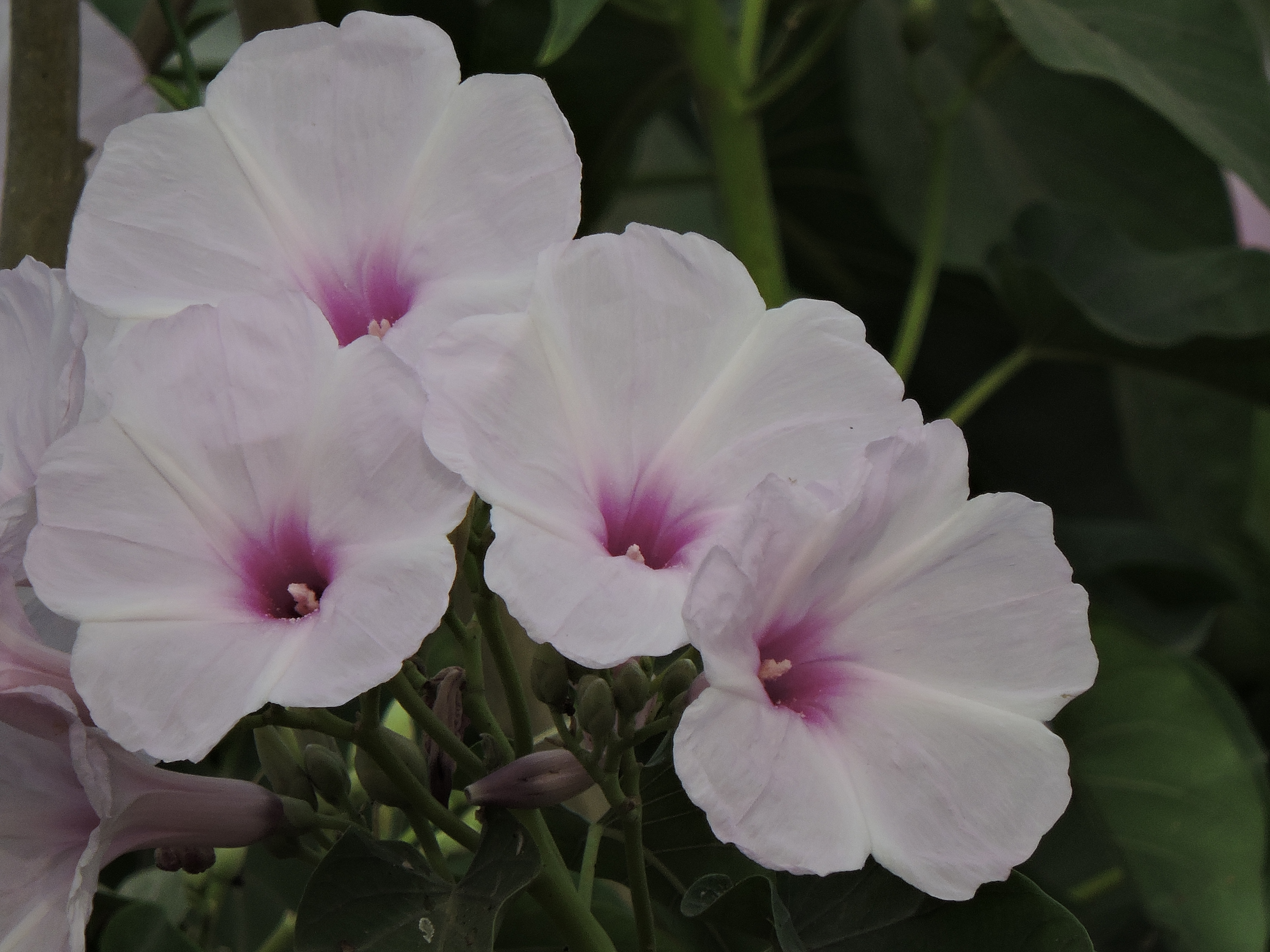
Ipomoea carnea

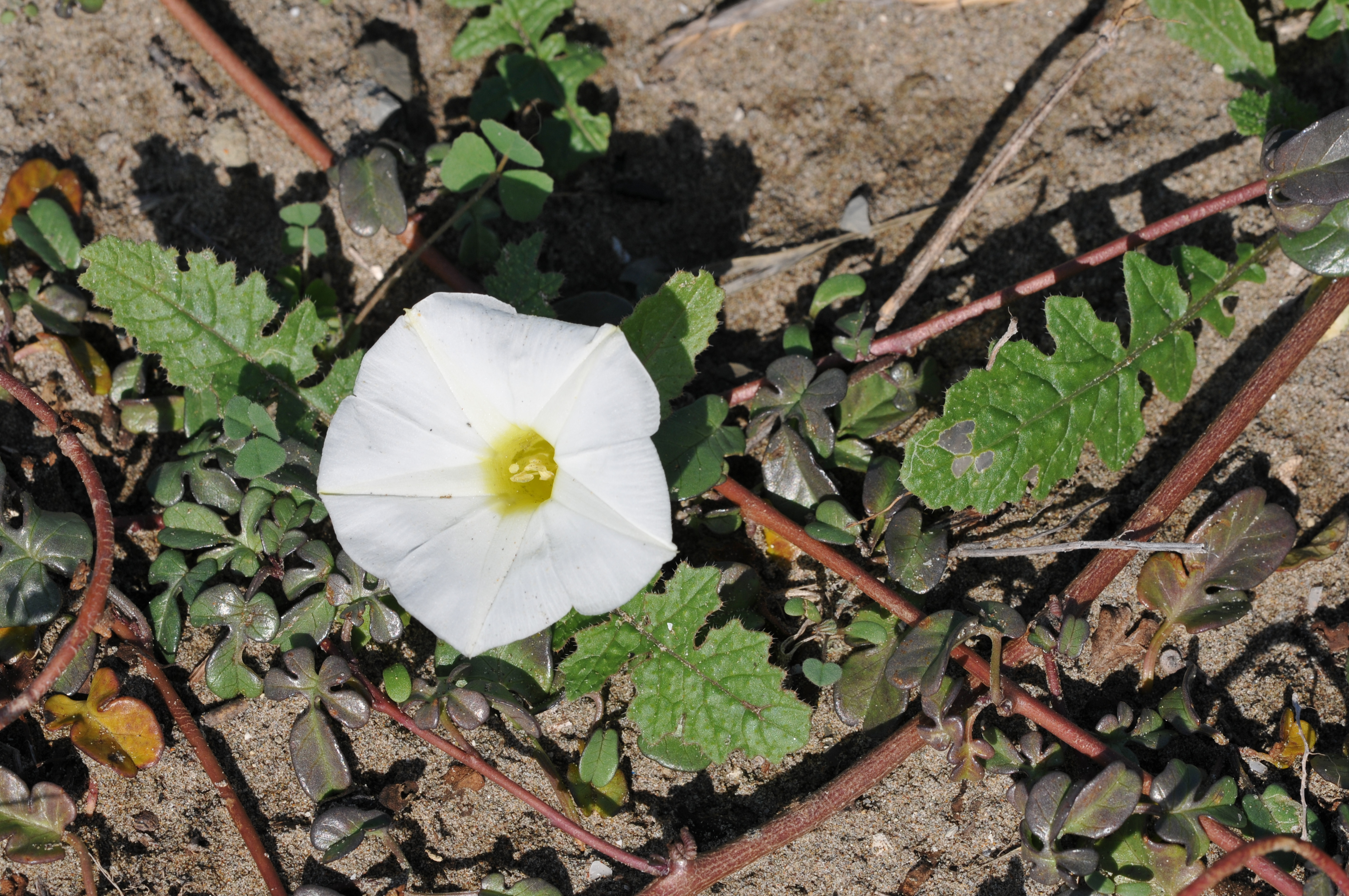
Ipomoea imperati

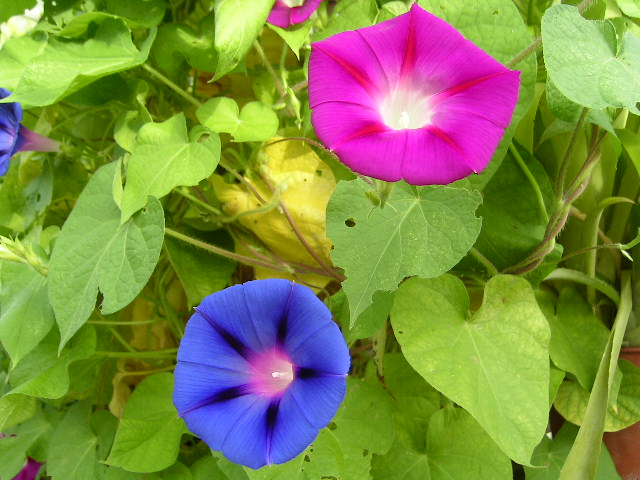
Ipomoea purpurea

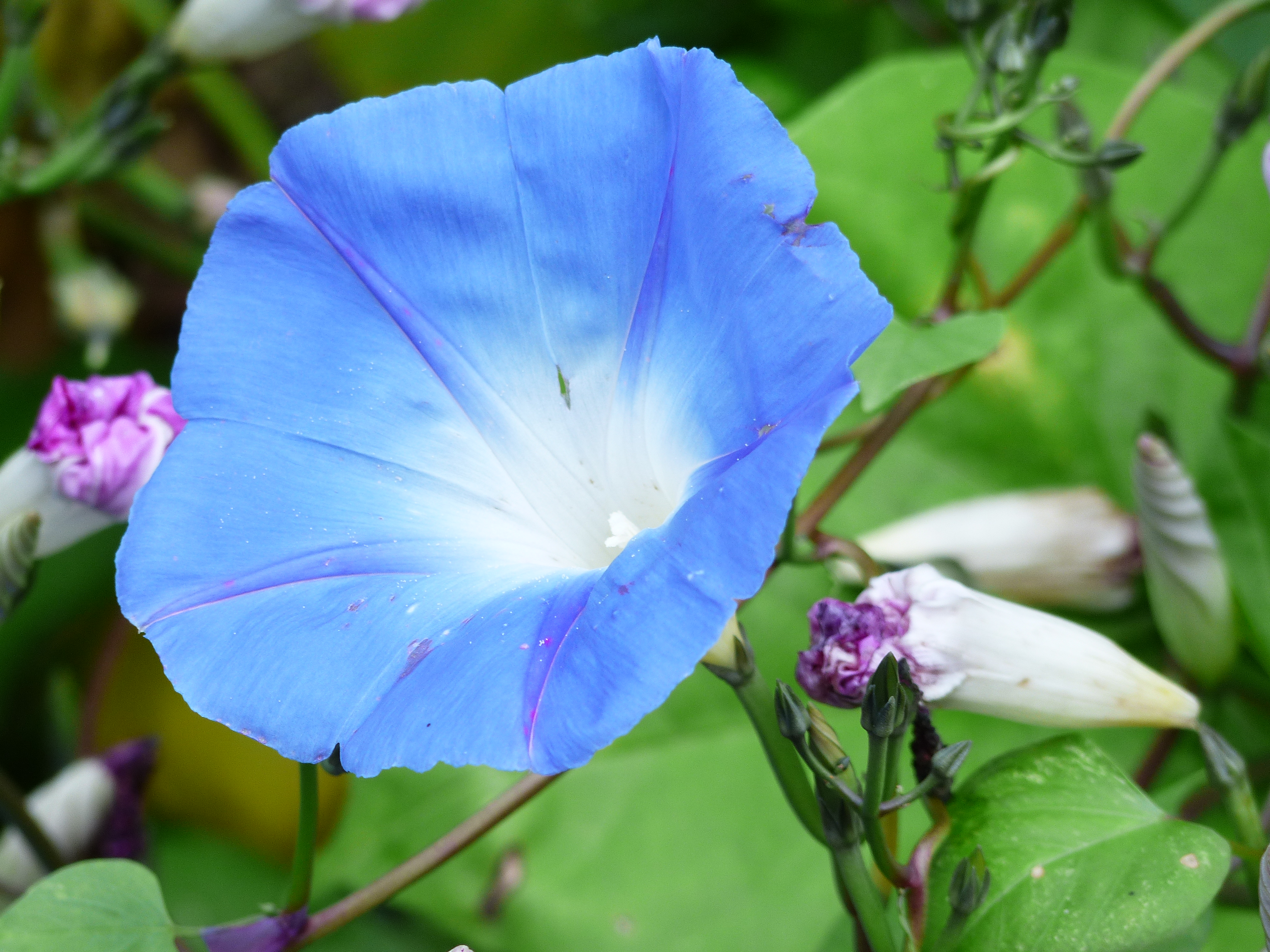
Ipomoea tricolor

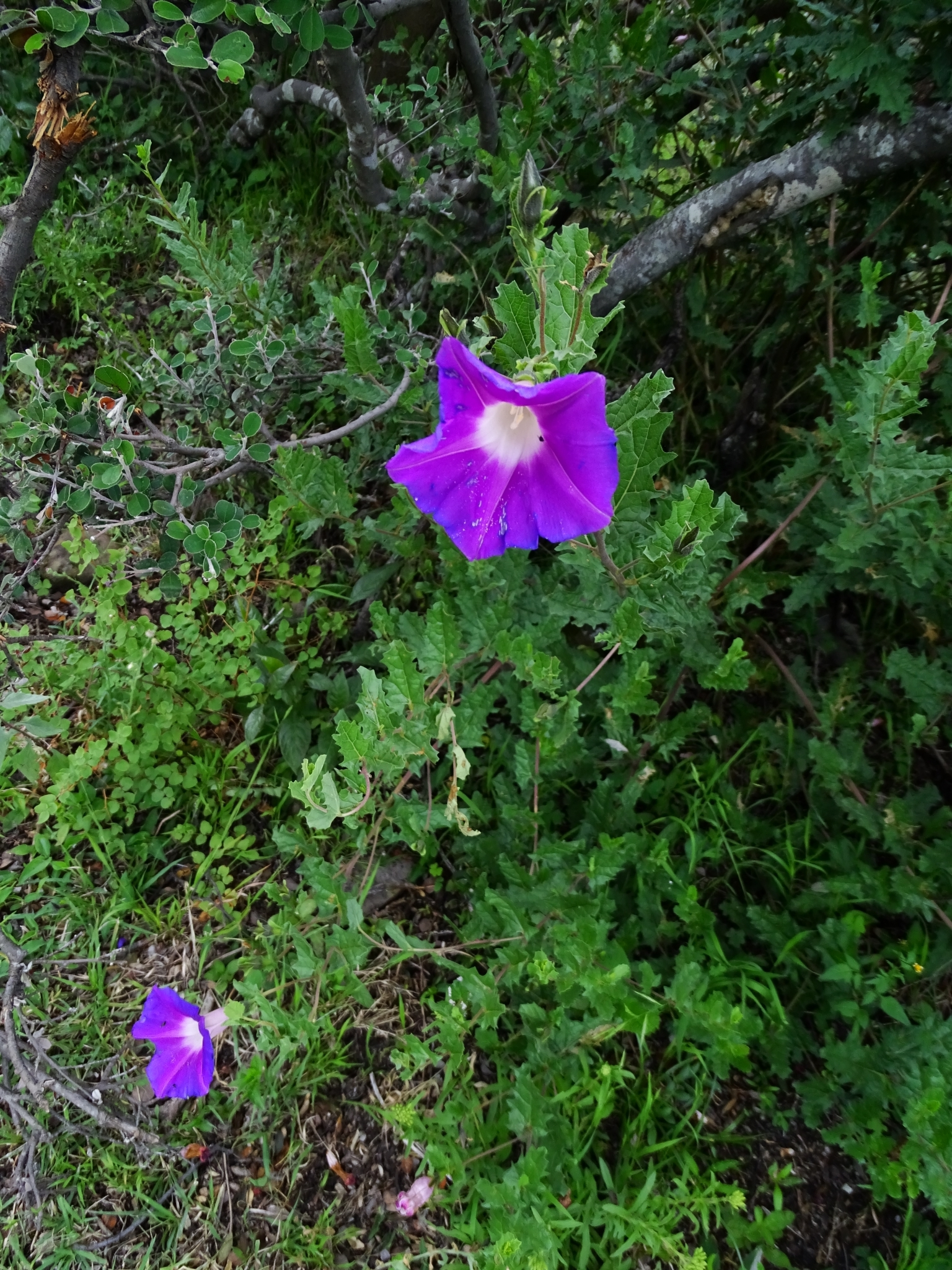
Ipomoea stans

- Ipomoea abrupta R.Br.
- Ipomoea abutiloides (Kunth) G.Don
- Ipomoea abyssinica (Choisy) Hochst.
- Ipomoea acanthocarpa (Choisy) Hochst. ex Schweinf. & Asch.
- Ipomoea acrensis J.R.I.Wood & Scotland
- Ipomoea aculeata Blume
- Ipomoea acutisepala O'Donell
- Ipomoea adenioides Schinz
- Ipomoea adumbrata Rendle & Britten
- Ipomoea aemilii (O'Donell) J.R.I.Wood & R.Degen
- Ipomoea aequiloba J.R.I.Wood & Scotland
- Ipomoea alba L. – moon vine
- Ipomoea albivenia (Lindl.) Sweet
- Ipomoea alexandrae D.F.Austin
- Ipomoea alterniflora Griseb.
- Ipomoea altoamazonica J.R.I.Wood & Scotland
- Ipomoea altoparanaensis O'Donell
- Ipomoea amazonica (D.F.Austin & Staples) J.R.I.Wood & Scotland
- Ipomoea amnicola Morong – red-center morning glory
- Ipomoea ampullacea Fernald
- Ipomoea ana-mariae L.V.Vasconc. & Sim.-Bianch.
- Ipomoea androyensis Deroin
- Ipomoea anemophoba Chiov.
- Ipomoea angustisepala O'Donell
- Ipomoea angustissima J.R.I.Wood & Scotland
- Ipomoea anisomeres B.L.Rob. & Bartlett
- Ipomoea antonschmidii R.W.Johnson
- Ipomoea appendiculata J.R.I.Wood & Scotland
- Ipomoea aprica House
- Ipomoea aquatica Forssk. – water spinach, water morning glory, water convolvulus, "Chinese spinach", "swamp cabbage"
- Ipomoea arborescens (Humb. & Bonpl. ex Willd.) G.Don
- Ipomoea ardissima A.Chev.
- Ipomoea arenicola Rendle & Britten
- Ipomoea argentaurata Hallier f.
- Ipomoea argentea Meisn.
- Ipomoea argentifolia A.Rich.
- Ipomoea argentinica Peter
- Ipomoea argillicola R.W.Johnson
- Ipomoea argyreia (Mart. ex Choisy) Meisn.
- Ipomoea argyrophylla Vatke
- Ipomoea aristolochiifolia G.Don
- Ipomoea asarifolia (Desr.) Roem. & Schult.
- Ipomoea asclepiadea Hallier f.
- Ipomoea aspera (Choisy) Vatke
- Ipomoea asplundii O'Donell
- Ipomoea asterophora Ooststr.
- Ipomoea atacorensis A.Chev.
- Ipomoea attenuata J.R.I.Wood & Scotland
- Ipomoea aurantiaca L.O.Williams
- Ipomoea aurifolia Dammer
- Ipomoea austrobrasiliensis J.R.I.Wood & Scotland
- Ipomoea bahiensis Willd.
- Ipomoea bakeri Britten
- Ipomoea balioclada Urb.
- Ipomoea bampsiana Lejoly & Lisowski
- Ipomoea barbatisepala A.Gray
- Ipomoea barlerioides (Choisy) Benth. ex C.B.Clarke
- Ipomoea barteri Baker
- Ipomoea batatas (L.) Lam. – sweet potato, "tuberous morning glory"
- Ipomoea batatoides Choisy
- Ipomoea bathycolpos Hallier f.
- Ipomoea beninensis Akoègn., Lisowski & Sinsin
- Ipomoea bernoulliana Peter
- Ipomoea biflora (L.) Pers.
- Ipomoea bisavium A.Meeuse
- Ipomoea blanchetii Choisy
- Ipomoea blepharophylla Hallier f.
- Ipomoea bolusiana Schinz
- Ipomoea bombycina (Choisy) Benth. & Hook.f. ex Hemsl.
- Ipomoea bonariensis Hook.
- Ipomoea bracteata Cav.
- Ipomoea bracteolata R.W.Johnson
- Ipomoea brasiliana (Mart. ex Choisy) Meisn.
- Ipomoea brassii C.T.White
- Ipomoea brownii Roem. & Schult.
- Ipomoea bullata Oliv.
- Ipomoea burchellii Meisn.
- Ipomoea cairica (L.) Sweet – Coast morning glory, Cairo morning glory, mile-a-minute vine, Messina creeper, railroad creeper
- Ipomoea calantha Griseb.
- Ipomoea calobra F.Muell.
- Ipomoea caloneura Meisn.
- Ipomoea calophylla C.Wright ex Griseb.
- Ipomoea calyptrata Dammer
- Ipomoea cambodiensis Gagnep. & Courchet
- Ipomoea campanulata L.
- Ipomoea campestris Meisn.
- Ipomoea capillacea (Kunth) G.Don
- Ipomoea capitellata Choisy
- Ipomoea cardenasiana O'Donell
- Ipomoea cardiophylla A.Gray
- Ipomoea carnea Jacq. – pink morning glory
- Ipomoea carolina L.
- Ipomoea caudata Fernald
- Ipomoea cavalcantei D.F.Austin
- Ipomoea cearensis O'Donell
- Ipomoea cerradoensis J.R.I.Wood & Scotland
- Ipomoea chamelana J.A.McDonald
- Ipomoea chapadensis J.R.I.Wood & L.V.Vasconc.
- Ipomoea cheirophylla O'Donell
- Ipomoea chenopodifolia (M.Martens & Galeotti) Hemsl.
- Ipomoea chiliantha Hallier f.
- Ipomoea chilopsidis Standl.
- Ipomoea chiquitensis J.R.I.Wood & Scotland
- Ipomoea chiriquensis Standl.
- Ipomoea chloroneura Hallier f.
- Ipomoea chodatiana O'Donell
- Ipomoea cholulensis Kunth
- Ipomoea chondrosepala Hallier f.
- Ipomoea chrysocalyx D.F.Austin
- Ipomoea chrysochaetia Hallier f.
- Ipomoea chrysosperma Hallier f.
- Ipomoea cicatricosa Baker
- Ipomoea ciervensis House
- Ipomoea citrina Hallier f.
- Ipomoea clarensis Alain
- Ipomoea clarkei Hook.f.
- Ipomoea clausa Rudolph ex Ledeb.
- Ipomoea clavata (G.Don) Ooststr. ex J.F.Macbr.
- Ipomoea coccinea L. – red morning glory, redstar, Mexican morning glory
- Ipomoea colombiana O'Donell
- Ipomoea concolora (Matuda) D.F.Austin
- Ipomoea connata J.R.I.Wood & L.V.Vasconc.
- Ipomoea consimilis Schulze-Menz
- Ipomoea convolvulifolia Hallier f.
- Ipomoea conzattii Greenm.
- Ipomoea coptica (L.) Roth ex Roem. & Schult.
- Ipomoea cordatotriloba Dennst. – little violet morning glory, purple bindweed
- Ipomoea cordillerae J.R.I.Wood & Scotland
- Ipomoea cordofana Choisy
- Ipomoea coriacea Choisy
- Ipomoea corrugata Thulin
- Ipomoea corymbosa (L.) Roth – heart-leaved morning glory
- Ipomoea coscinosperma Hochst. ex Choisy
- Ipomoea costata F.Muell. ex Benth. – rock morning glory, bush potato
- Ipomoea costellata Torr. – crest-ribbed morning glory
- Ipomoea crassipes Hook.
- Ipomoea crepidiformis Hallier f.
- Ipomoea crinicalyx S.Moore
- Ipomoea crispa (Thunb.) Hallier f.
- Ipomoea cristulata Hallier f. – trans-Pecos morning glory
- Ipomoea cryptica J.R.I.Wood & Scotland
- Ipomoea cubensis (House) Urb.
- Ipomoea cuneifolia Meisn.
- Ipomoea cuprinacoma E.Carranza & J.A.McDonald
- Ipomoea curtipes Rendle
- Ipomoea cuscoensis J.R.I.Wood & P.Muñoz
- Ipomoea cynanchifolia Meisn.
- Ipomoea darainensis Deroin, Ranir. & Nusb.
- Ipomoea dasycarpa J.R.I.Wood & Scotland
- Ipomoea daturiflora Meisn.
- Ipomoea decaisnei Ooststr.
- Ipomoea decemcornuta O'Donell
- Ipomoea decipiens Dammer
- Ipomoea delphinioides Choisy
- Ipomoea delpierrei De Wild.
- Ipomoea deminuta J.R.I.Wood & Scotland
- Ipomoea densibracteata O'Donell
- Ipomoea densivestita R.W.Johnson
- Ipomoea descolei O'Donell
- Ipomoea desmophylla Bojer ex Choisy
- Ipomoea desrousseauxii Steud.
- Ipomoea diamantinensis J.M.Black ex Eardley
- Ipomoea diantha Roem. & Schult.
- Ipomoea dichroa Hochst. ex Choisy
- Ipomoea diegoae M.C.Lara
- Ipomoea digitata L.
- Ipomoea discoidea Gonz.-Martínez & J.Jiménez Ram.
- Ipomoea discolor (Kunth) G.Don
- Ipomoea distans Choisy
- Ipomoea diversifolia R.Br.
- Ipomoea dolichopoda J.R.I.Wood & Scotland
- Ipomoea donaldsonii Rendle
- Ipomoea dubia Roem. & Schult.
- Ipomoea dumetorum (Kunth) Willd. – railwaycreeper
- Ipomoea dumosa (Benth.) L.O.Williams
- Ipomoea dunlopii R.W.Johnson
- Ipomoea durangensis House
- Ipomoea duvigneaudii Lejoly & Lisowski
- Ipomoea echinocalyx Meisn.
- Ipomoea edithae Gage
- Ipomoea eggersiana Peter – Egger's morning glory
- Ipomoea electrina D.F.Austin & J.A.McDonald
- Ipomoea elongata Choisy
- Ipomoea elytrocephala Hallier f.
- Ipomoea emeiensis Z.Y.Zhu
- Ipomoea emetica Choisy
- Ipomoea ensiformis J.R.I.Wood & Scotland
- Ipomoea ephemera Verdc.
- Ipomoea eremnobrocha D.F.Austin
- Ipomoea eriocalyx (Mart. ex Choisy) Meisn.
- Ipomoea eriocarpa R.Br.
- Ipomoea erioleuca Hallier f.
- Ipomoea erosa Urb.
- Ipomoea estrellensis Hassl. ex O'Donell
- Ipomoea eurysepala Hallier f.
- Ipomoea eximia House
- Ipomoea expansa A.McDonald
- Ipomoea exserta J.R.I.Wood & Scotland
- Ipomoea falkioides Griseb.
- Ipomoea fanshawei Verdc.
- Ipomoea fasciculata J.R.I.Wood & Scotland
- Ipomoea ficifolia Lindl.
- Ipomoea fiebrigii Hassl. ex O'Donell
- Ipomoea fimbriosepala Choisy
- Ipomoea fissifolia (McPherson) Eckenw.
- Ipomoea flavivillosa Schulze-Menz
- Ipomoea franciscana Choisy
- Ipomoea fuchsioides Griseb.
- Ipomoea fulvicaulis (Hochst. ex Choisy) Boiss. ex Hallier f.
- Ipomoea funicularis R.W.Johnson
- Ipomoea funis Cham. & Schltdl.
- Ipomoea furcyensis Urb.
- Ipomoea galactorrhoea Hallier f.
- Ipomoea galhareriana Thulin
- Ipomoea garckeana Vatke
- Ipomoea geophilifolia K.Afzel.
- Ipomoea gesnerioides J.A.McDonald
- Ipomoea gigantea (Silva Manso) Choisy
- Ipomoea gilana K.Keith & J.A.McDonald
- Ipomoea gloverae J.A.McDonald
- Ipomoea goyazensis Gardner
- Ipomoea gracilis R.Br.
- Ipomoea gracilisepala Rendle
- Ipomoea graminea R.Br.
- Ipomoea graminifolia J.R.I.Wood & Scotland
- Ipomoea grandifolia (Dammer) O'Donell
- Ipomoea graniticola J.R.I.Wood & Scotland
- Ipomoea grantii Oliv.
- Ipomoea granulosa Chodat & Hassl.
- Ipomoea guaranitica Chodat & Hassl.
- Ipomoea gypsophila J.R.I.Wood & Scotland
- Ipomoea habeliana Oliv.
- Ipomoea hackeliana (Schinz) Hallier f.
- Ipomoea haenkeana Choisy
- Ipomoea harlingii D.F.Austin
- Ipomoea harmandii Gagnep.
- Ipomoea hartmannii Vatke & Rensch
- Ipomoea hartwegii Benth.
- Ipomoea hastifolia Domin
- Ipomoea hastigera Kunth
- Ipomoea hederacea Jacq. – ivy-leaved morning glory
- Ipomoea hederifolia L. – scarlet morning glory, scarlet creeper, star ipomoea
- Ipomoea heptaphylla Sweet – Wright's morning glory
- Ipomoea herpeana Deroin
- Ipomoea heterodoxa Standl. & Steyerm.
- Ipomoea heterosepala Baker
- Ipomoea heterotricha Didr.
- Ipomoea hewittacea (Kuntze) J.R.I.Wood & Scotland
- Ipomoea hieronymi (Kuntze) O'Donell
- Ipomoea hildebrandtii Vatke
- Ipomoea hiranensis Thulin
- Ipomoea hirsutissima Gardner
- Ipomoea hirtifolia R.C.Fang & S.H.Huang
- Ipomoea hochstetteri House
- Ipomoea holubii Baker
- Ipomoea homotrichoidea O'Donell
- Ipomoea horsfalliae Hook. – Lady Doorly's morning glory, cardinal creeper, Prince Kuhio vine
- Ipomoea huayllae J.R.I.Wood & Scotland
- Ipomoea humidicola Verdc.
- Ipomoea hypargyrea Griseb.
- Ipomoea ignava House
- Ipomoea imperati (Vahl) Griseb.
- Ipomoea inaccessa J.R.I.Wood & Scotland
- Ipomoea incarnata (Vahl) Choisy
- Ipomoea incerta (Britton) Urb.
- Ipomoea indica (Burm.) Merr. – oceanblue morning glory, blue morning glory, blue dawn flower
- Ipomoea indivisa (Vell.) Hallier f.
- Ipomoea intrapilosa Rose
- Ipomoea invicta House
- Ipomoea involucrata P.Beauv.
- Ipomoea irwiniae Verdc.
- Ipomoea isthmica J.R.I.Wood & Buril
- Ipomoea itapuaensis J.R.I.Wood & R.Degen
- Ipomoea jacalana Matuda
- Ipomoea jaegeri Pilg.
- Ipomoea jalapa (L.) Pursh
- Ipomoea jalapoides Griseb.
- Ipomoea jamaicensis G.Don
- Ipomoea jicama Brandegee
- Ipomoea johnsoniana R.L.Barrett
- Ipomoea jucunda Thwaites
- Ipomoea jujuyensis O'Donell
- Ipomoea juliagutierreziae J.R.I.Wood & Scotland
- Ipomoea kahloae Gonz.-Martínez, Lozada-Pérez & Rios-Carr.
- Ipomoea kalumburu R.W.Johnson
- Ipomoea kassneri Rendle
- Ipomoea katangensis Lisowski & Wiland
- Ipomoea keraudreniae Deroin
- Ipomoea killipiana O'Donell
- Ipomoea kilwaensis Pilg.
- Ipomoea kituiensis Vatke
- Ipomoea kotschyana Hochst. ex Choisy
- Ipomoea kraholandica J.R.I.Wood & Scotland
- Ipomoea kruseana Matuda
- Ipomoea kunthiana Meisn.
- Ipomoea lachnaea Spreng.
- Ipomoea lactifera J.R.I.Wood & Scotland
- Ipomoea lacunosa L. – whitestar potato, whitestar
- Ipomoea laeta A.Gray ex S.Watson
- Ipomoea lambii Fernald
- Ipomoea lanata E.A.Bruce
- Ipomoea langsdorffii Choisy
- Ipomoea lanuginosa O'Donell
- Ipomoea lapathifolia Hallier f.
- Ipomoea lapidosa Vatke
- Ipomoea laxiflora H.J.Chowdhery & Debta
- Ipomoea lenis House
- Ipomoea leonensis B.L.Rob.
- Ipomoea lepidophora Lebrun & Taton
- Ipomoea leprieurii D.F.Austin
- Ipomoea leptophylla Torr. – bush morning glory, bush moonflower, manroot
- Ipomoea × leucantha Jacq.
- Ipomoea leucanthemum (Klotzsch) Hallier f.
- Ipomoea leucotricha Donn.Sm.
- Ipomoea lilloana O'Donell
- Ipomoea limosa R.W.Johnson
- Ipomoea lindenii M.Martens & Galeotti
- Ipomoea lindheimeri A.Gray – Lindheimer's morning glory
- Ipomoea lindmanii Urb.
- Ipomoea lineolata Urb.
- Ipomoea linosepala Hallier f.
- Ipomoea littoralis Blume – white-flowered beach morning glory
- Ipomoea livescens (Schltdl. ex Kunze) Meisn.
- Ipomoea lobata (Cerv.) Thell. – fire vine, Spanish flag
- Ipomoea lonchophylla J.M.Black
- Ipomoea longeramosa Choisy
- Ipomoea longibarbis J.R.I.Wood & Scotland
- Ipomoea longibracteolata Sim.-Bianch. & J.R.I.Wood
- Ipomoea longifolia Benth. – pink-throated morning glory
- Ipomoea longirostra J.R.I.Wood & Scotland
- Ipomoea longistaminea O'Donell
- Ipomoea longituba Hallier f.
- Ipomoea lottiae J.A.McDonald
- Ipomoea lozanii Painter ex House
- Ipomoea lutea Hemsl.
- Ipomoea luteoviridis Ekman & Leonard
- Ipomoea macarenaensis J.R.I.Wood & Scotland
- Ipomoea macdonaldii E.Carranza
- Ipomoea macedoi Hoehne
- Ipomoea macrorhiza Michx. – large-rooted morning glory
- Ipomoea macrosepala Brenan
- Ipomoea macrosiphon Hallier f.
- Ipomoea madrensis S.Watson
- Ipomoea magna Sim.-Bianch. & J.R.I.Wood
- Ipomoea magniflora O'Donell
- Ipomoea magnifolia Rusby
- Ipomoea magnusiana Schinz
- Ipomoea mairetii Choisy
- Ipomoea malpighipila O'Donell
- Ipomoea malvaeoides Meisn.
- Ipomoea malvaviscoides Meisn.
- Ipomoea marabensis D.F.Austin & Secco
- Ipomoea maranyonensis J.R.I.Wood & Scotland
- Ipomoea marcellia Meisn.
- Ipomoea marginisepala O'Donell
- Ipomoea marmorata Britten & Rendle
- Ipomoea mathewsiana Kuntze
- Ipomoea maurandioides Meisn.
- Ipomoea mauritiana Jacq. – giant potato
- Ipomoea mcphersonii D.F.Austin
- Ipomoea mcvaughii McPherson
- Ipomoea megalantha J.R.I.Wood & Scotland
- Ipomoea megapotamica Choisy
- Ipomoea melancholica J.R.I.Wood & Buril
- Ipomoea mendozae J.R.I.Wood & Scotland
- Ipomoea merremioides Alain
- Ipomoea meyeri (Spreng.) G.Don – Meyer's morning glory
- Ipomoea micrantha Hallier f.
- Ipomoea microcalyx Schulze-Menz
- Ipomoea microdactyla Griseb. – calcareous morning glory
- Ipomoea microdonta J.R.I.Wood & Scotland
- Ipomoea microsepala Benth.
- Ipomoea milnei Verdc.
- Ipomoea minutiflora M.Martens & Galeotti) House
- Ipomoea miquihuanensis J.A.McDonald
- Ipomoea mirabilis P.P.A.Ferreira & Sim.-Bianch.
- Ipomoea mirandina (Pittier) O'Donell
- Ipomoea mitchellae Standl.
- Ipomoea mombassana Vatke
- Ipomoea montecristina Hadac
- Ipomoea morongii Britton
- Ipomoea mucronatoproducta J.R.I.Wood & Scotland
- Ipomoea mucronifolia J.R.I.Wood & Scotland
- Ipomoea muelleri Benth.
- Ipomoea muricata (L.) Jacq. – lilacbell
- Ipomoea murucoides Roem. & Schult.
- Ipomoea nationis (Hook.) G.Nicholson
- Ipomoea neei (Spreng.) O'Donell
- Ipomoea nematoloba Urb.
- Ipomoea nematophylla Urb.
- Ipomoea nephrosepala Chiov.
- Ipomoea neurocephala Hallier f.
- Ipomoea nil (L.) Roth – white-edged morning glory, ivy morning glory, Japanese morning glory
- Ipomoea nitida Griseb.
- Ipomoea noctulifolia McPherson
- Ipomoea noemana Jara
- Ipomoea nyctaginea Choisy
- Ipomoea oblongata E.Mey. ex Choisy
- Ipomoea oblongifolia (Hassl.) O'Donell
- Ipomoea obscura (L.) Ker Gawl. – obscure morning glory, small white morning glory
- Ipomoea ochracea (Lindl.) Sweet – fence morning glory
- Ipomoea odontophylla J.R.I.Wood & Scotland
- Ipomoea oenotherae (Vatke) Hallier f.
- Ipomoea oenotheroides (L.f.) A.Meeuse & Welman
- Ipomoea ommanneyi Rendle
- Ipomoea ophiodes Standl. & Steyerm.
- Ipomoea opulifolia Rusby
- Ipomoea oranensis O'Donell
- Ipomoea orizabensis (G.Pelletan) Ledeb. ex Steud.
- Ipomoea ovatolanceolata (Hallier f.) Thulin
- Ipomoea padillae O'Donell
- Ipomoea paludicola J.R.I.Wood & Scotland
- Ipomoea paludosa O'Donell
- Ipomoea pampeana P.P.A.Ferreira & Miotto
- Ipomoea pandurata (L.) G.Mey. – wild potato vine, big-rooted morning glory, man-of-the-earth, manroot
- Ipomoea pantanalensis J.R.I.Wood & Urbanetz
- Ipomoea paolii Chiov.
- Ipomoea papilio Hallier f.
- Ipomoea paradae J.R.I.Wood & Scotland
- Ipomoea paraguariensis Peter
- Ipomoea paranaensis Hoehne
- Ipomoea parasitica (Kunth) G.Don
- Ipomoea parvibracteolata J.R.I.Wood & L.V.Vasconc.
- Ipomoea passifloroides House
- Ipomoea pauciflora M.Martens & Galeotti
- Ipomoea paulistana (Silva Manso) Stellfeld
- Ipomoea paulitschkei Schweinf. & Volkens
- Ipomoea pearceana Kuntze
- Ipomoea pedicellaris Benth.
- Ipomoea pellita Hallier f.
- Ipomoea perpartita McPherson
- Ipomoea perrieri Deroin
- Ipomoea peruviana O'Donell
- Ipomoea pes-caprae (L.) R.Br. – beach morning glory, goat's foot
- Ipomoea pes-tigridis L.
- Ipomoea peteri (Kuntze) Staples & Govaerts
- Ipomoea petitiana Lejoly & Lisowski
- Ipomoea petrophila House
- Ipomoea philomega (Vell.) House
- Ipomoea pierrei Gagnep.
- Ipomoea pileata Roxb.
- Ipomoea pinifolia Meisn.
- Ipomoea pintoi O'Donell
- Ipomoea pittieri O'Donell
- Ipomoea platensis Ker Gawl.
- Ipomoea plummerae A.Gray – Huachuca Mountain morning glory
- Ipomoea pogonantha Thulin
- Ipomoea pogonocalyx J.R.I.Wood & Scotland
- Ipomoea pohlii Choisy
- Ipomoea polhillii Verdc.
- Ipomoea polpha R.W.Johnson
- Ipomoea polymorpha Roem. & Schult.
- Ipomoea polyrrhizos (Silva Manso) Choisy
- Ipomoea populina House
- Ipomoea porrecta Rendle & Britten
- Ipomoea praecana House
- Ipomoea praecox C.Wright
- Ipomoea praematura Eckenw.
- Ipomoea prismatosyphon Welw.
- Ipomoea procumbens Mart. ex Choisy
- Ipomoea procurrens Meisn.
- Ipomoea prolifera J.R.I.Wood & Scotland
- Ipomoea protea Rendle & Britten
- Ipomoea proxima (M.Martens & Galeotti) Godm. & Salvin
- Ipomoea pruinosa McPherson
- Ipomoea psammophila J.R.I.Wood & Scotland
- Ipomoea pseudomarginata Deroin
- Ipomoea pseudoracemosa McPherson
- Ipomoea pterocaulis J.R.I.Wood & L.V.Vasconc.
- Ipomoea pubescens Lam. – silky morning glory
- Ipomoea pulcherrima Ooststr.
- Ipomoea puncticulata Benth.
- Ipomoea punicea (Silva Manso) Choisy
- Ipomoea purga (Wender.) Hayne – Vera Cruz jalap
- Ipomoea purpurea (L.) Roth – common morning glory, purple morning glory, tall morning glory
- Ipomoea pyramidalis Hallier f.
- Ipomoea pyrenea Taub.
- Ipomoea pyrophila A.Chev.
- Ipomoea quamoclit L. – cypress vine, cypressvine morning glory, cardinal creeper, cardinal vine, star glory, hummingbird vine
- Ipomoea queirozii J.R.I.Wood & L.V.Vasconc.
- Ipomoea racemigera F.Muell. & Tate
- Ipomoea racemosa Poir.
- Ipomoea ramboi O'Donell
- Ipomoea ramosissima (Poir.) Choisy
- Ipomoea recta De Wild.
- Ipomoea reflexa Span.
- Ipomoea reflexisepala Lejoly & Lisowski
- Ipomoea regnellii Meisn.
- Ipomoea repanda Jacq.
- Ipomoea reticulata O'Donell
- Ipomoea retropilosa (Pittier) D.F.Austin
- Ipomoea revoluta J.R.I.Wood & Scotland
- Ipomoea rhomboidea House
- Ipomoea richardsiae Verdc.
- Ipomoea riograndensis P.P.A.Ferreira & Miotto
- Ipomoea riparum Standl. & L.O.Williams
- Ipomoea robbrechtii Lejoly & Lisowski
- Ipomoea robertsiana Rendle
- Ipomoea robinsonii House
- Ipomoea robusta Urb.
- Ipomoea robynsiana Lejoly & Lisowski
- Ipomoea rojasii Hassl.
- Ipomoea rosea Choisy
- Ipomoea rotundata Verdc.
- Ipomoea rubens Choisy
- Ipomoea rubriflora O'Donell
- Ipomoea rumicifolia Choisy
- Ipomoea rupestris Sim.-Bianch. & Pirani
- Ipomoea rupicola House – cliff morning glory
- Ipomoea rzedowskii E.Carranza, Zamudio & Murguía
- Ipomoea sagittata Poir. – saltmarsh morning glory
- Ipomoea sagittifolia Burm.f.
- Ipomoea saintronanensis R.W.Johnson
- Ipomoea salicifolia Roxb.
- Ipomoea salsettensis Santapau & Patel
- Ipomoea santacruzensis O'Donell
- Ipomoea santillanii O'Donell
- Ipomoea saopaulista O'Donell
- Ipomoea schaffneri S.Watson
- Ipomoea schaijesii Lejoly & Lisowski
- Ipomoea schomburgkii Choisy
- Ipomoea schulziana O'Donell
- Ipomoea scopulina J.R.I.Wood & Scotland
- Ipomoea scopulorum Brandegee
- Ipomoea seaania Felger & Austin
- Ipomoea seducta House
- Ipomoea selleana Urb.
- Ipomoea sepacuitensis Donn.Sm.
- Ipomoea sericophylla Meisn.
- Ipomoea sericosepala J.R.I.Wood & Scotland
- Ipomoea serrana Sim.-Bianch. & L.V.Vasconc.
- Ipomoea sescossiana Baill.
- Ipomoea setifera Poir.
- Ipomoea setosa Ker Gawl. – Brazilian morning glory
- Ipomoea shirambensis Baker
- Ipomoea shumardiana (Torr.) Shinners – narrow-leaved morning glory
- Ipomoea shupangensis Baker
- Ipomoea sidamensis Thulin
- Ipomoea sidifolia Schrad.
- Ipomoea silvicola House
- Ipomoea simonsiana Rendle
- Ipomoea simplex Thunb.
- Ipomoea simulans D.Hanb. – Tampico jalap
- Ipomoea sindica Stapf
- Ipomoea sofomarensis Sebsebe
- Ipomoea sororia D.F.Austin & J.L.Tapia
- Ipomoea spathulata Hallier f.
- Ipomoea spectata J.A.McDonald
- Ipomoea sphenophylla Urb.
- Ipomoea spinulifera J.R.I.Wood & Scotland
- Ipomoea splendor-sylvae House
- Ipomoea spruceana Benth. ex Meisn.
- Ipomoea squamisepala O'Donell
- Ipomoea squamosa Choisy
- Ipomoea stans Cav.
- Ipomoea staphylina Roem. & Schult.
- Ipomoea steerei (Standl.) L.O.William
- Ipomoea stenophylla Meisn.
- Ipomoea stenosiphon Hallier f.
- Ipomoea steudelii Millsp. – Steudel's morning glory
- Ipomoea stibaropoda Ooststr.
- Ipomoea stocksii C.B.Clarke
- Ipomoea stuckertii O'Donell
- Ipomoea suaveolens (M.Martens & Galeotti) Hemsl.
- Ipomoea subincana (Choisy) Meisn.
- Ipomoea subrevoluta Choisy
- Ipomoea subspicata (Meisn.) O'Donell
- Ipomoea subtomentosa (Chodat & Hassl.) O'Donell
- Ipomoea suburceolata O'Donell
- Ipomoea suffruticosa Burch.
- Ipomoea suffulta (Kunth) G.Don
- Ipomoea sulina P.P.A.Ferreira & Miotto
- Ipomoea sulphurea (La Llave) G.Don
- Ipomoea sultani Chiov.
- Ipomoea sumatrana (Miq.) Ooststr.
- Ipomoea syringifolia Meisn.
- Ipomoea tabascana J.A.McDonald & D.F.Austin
- Ipomoea tacambarensis E.Carranza
- Ipomoea tarijensis O'Donell
- Ipomoea tastensis Brandegee from Baja California Sur
- Ipomoea tehuantepecensis L.Torres, R.Torres, M.P.Ramírez & J.A.McDonald
- Ipomoea temascaltepecensis Wilkin
- Ipomoea tenera Meisn.
- Ipomoea tentaculifera Greenm.
- Ipomoea tenuifolia (Vahl) Kuntze
- Ipomoea tenuiloba Torr. – spiderleaf
- Ipomoea tenuipes Verdc.
- Ipomoea tenuirostris Choisy
- Ipomoea tenuissima Choisy – rockland morning glory
- Ipomoea teotitlanica McPherson
- Ipomoea ternata Jacq.
- Ipomoea ternifolia Cav. – triple-leaved morning glory
- Ipomoea theodori O'Donell
- Ipomoea thunbergioides Welw.
- Ipomoea thurberi A.Gray – Thurber's morning glory
- Ipomoea ticcopa Verdc.
- Ipomoea tiliacea (Willd.) Choisy
- Ipomoea tolmerana R.W.Johnson
- Ipomoea transvaalensis A.Meeuse
- Ipomoea trichosperma Blume
- Ipomoea tricolor Cav. – Mexican morning glory
- Ipomoea trifida (Kunth) G.Don Wild ancestor of the sweet potato
- Ipomoea triflora Forssk.
- Ipomoea triloba L. – Krug's white morning glory, littlebell, Aiea morning glory
- Ipomoea trinervia Schulze-Menz
- Ipomoea tuberculata Ker Gawl.
- Ipomoea tubiflora Hook.f.
- Ipomoea tuboides O.Deg. & Ooststr. – Hawaii morning glory
- Ipomoea ugborea Ogunw.
- Ipomoea uninervis J.R.I.Wood & Scotland
- Ipomoea urbaniana (Dammer) Hallier f.
- Ipomoea urbinei House
- Ipomoea uruguayensis Meisn.
- Ipomoea vagans Baker
- Ipomoea valenzuelensis Chodat & Hassl.
- Ipomoea variifolia Meisn.
- Ipomoea veadeirosii J.R.I.Wood & Scotland
- Ipomoea velardei O'Donell
- Ipomoea velutina R.Br.
- Ipomoea velutinifolia J.R.I.Wood & Scotland
- Ipomoea venosa (Desr.) Roem. & Schult.
- Ipomoea verbasciformis (Meisn.) O'Donell
- Ipomoea verbascoidea Choisy
- Ipomoea verdcourtiana Lejoly & Lisowski
- Ipomoea vernalis R.E.Fr.
- Ipomoea verrucisepala Verdc.
- Ipomoea verruculosa (Pittier) O'Donell
- Ipomoea versipellis R.W.Johnson
- Ipomoea vestalii Standl.
- Ipomoea villifera House
- Ipomoea violacea L. – beach moonflower, sea moonflower
- Ipomoea virgata Meisn.
- Ipomoea viridis Choisy
- Ipomoea vivianae Krapov.
- Ipomoea volcanensis O'Donell
- Ipomoea walpersiana Duchass. ex Urb.
- Ipomoea walteri J.R.I.Wood & Scotland
- Ipomoea wangii C.Y.Wu
- Ipomoea welwitschii Vatke ex Hallier f.
- Ipomoea wightii (Wall.) Choisy
- Ipomoea wolcottiana Rose
- Ipomoea yaracuyensis J.R.Grande & W.Meier
- Ipomoea yardiensis A.S.George
- Ipomoea zanzibarica Verdc.
- Ipomoea zimmermanii J.A.McDonald

=== Horticultural hybrids ===
- Ipomoea × multifida
- Ipomoea × sloteri

=== Formerly placed here ===
- Ellisia nyctelea (L.) L. (as I. nyctelea L.)
- Jacquemontia ovalifolia (as I. ovalifolia Choisy)
- Jacquemontia tamnifolia (L.) Griseb. (as I. tamnifolia L.)
- Merremia aegyptia (L.) Urb. (as I. aegyptia L.)
- Merremia cissoides (Lam.) Hallier f. (as I. cissoides (Lam.) Griseb.)
- Merremia discoidesperma (Donn. Sm.) O'Donell (as I. discoidesperma Donn. Sm.)
- Merremia dissecta (Jacq.) Hallier f. (as I. dissecta (Jacq.) Pursh or I. sinuata Ortega)
- Merremia emarginata (Burm. f.) Hallier f. (as I. reniformis (Roxb.) Sweet)
- Merremia kingii (Prain) Kerr (as I. kingii Prain)
- Merremia mammosa (Lour.) Hallier f. (as I. mammosa (Lour.) Choisy)
- Merremia peltata (L.) Merr. (as I. nymphaeifolia Blume)
- Merremia pterygocaulos (Choisy) Hallier f. (as I. pterygocaulos Choisy)
- Merremia quinquefolia (L.) Hallier f. (as I. quinquefolia L.)
- Merremia sibirica (L.) Hallier f. (as I. sibirica (L.) Pers.)
- Merremia tuberosa (L.) Rendle (as I. tuberosa L.)
- Merremia umbellata (L.) Hallierf. (as I. polyanthes Roem. & Schult. or I. pterodes Choisy)
- Operculina aequisepala (Domin) R.W.Johnson (as I. aequisepala Domin)
- Operculina hamiltonii (G.Don) D.F.Austin & Staples (I. hamiltonii G.Don)
- Operculina turpethum (L.) Silva Manso (as I. turpethum (L.) R.Br.)
- Piper kadsura (Choisy) Ohwi (as I. kadsura Choisy)
- Stictocardia macalusoi (Mattei) Verdc. (as I. macalusoi Mattei)
- Stictocardia tiliifolia (Desr.) Hallier f. (as I. campanulata L.)
- Turbina corymbosa (L.) Raf. (as I. burmannii Choisy)
- Xenostegia medium (L.) D.F.Austin & Staples (as I. medium (L.) Druce)
- Xenostegia tridentata (L.) D.F.Austin & Staples (as I. angustifolia Jacq.)
