= Ipomoea pedicellaris =

Scientific classification
- Kingdom: Plantae
- Clade: Tracheophytes
- Clade: Angiosperms
- Clade: Eudicots
- Clade: Asterids
- Order: Solanales
- Family: Convolvulaceae
- Genus: Ipomoea
- Species: I. pedicellaris

Binomial name
- Ipomoea pedicellaris Benth.

Species of flowering plant

Ipomoea pedicellaris is a species of climbing herbaceous plant. It belongs to the morning glory genus (Ipomoea) of the bindweed family (Convolvulaceae). It is native to Mexico, El Salvador, Guatemala, and Honduras.
