= Ipomoea kahloae =

Scientific classification
- Kingdom: Plantae
- Clade: Embryophytes
- Clade: Tracheophytes
- Clade: Angiosperms
- Clade: Eudicots
- Clade: Asterids
- Order: Solanales
- Family: Convolvulaceae
- Genus: Ipomoea
- Species: I. kahloae

Binomial name
- Ipomoea kahloae Gonz.-Martínez, Lozada-Pérez & Rios-Carr.

Species of flowering plant

Ipomoea kahloae is a species of flowering plant in the morning glory genus Ipomoea, family Convolvulaceae, native to the state of Guerrero, Mexico. Known from only a few localities in semi-deciduous tropical forests, it has a number of distinctive features, including stems and petioles with pronounced wings, and magenta corollas.

The specific epithet "... honors the Mexican artist Frida Kahlo (1907–1954), one of the most influential Latin American artists of the 20th century. Frida Kahlo, besides being a painter, participated in many cultural, academic and political activities and was a social activist. Kahlo revived the roots of Mexican popular art and became a cultural reference point for the people of Mexico and its national identity."
