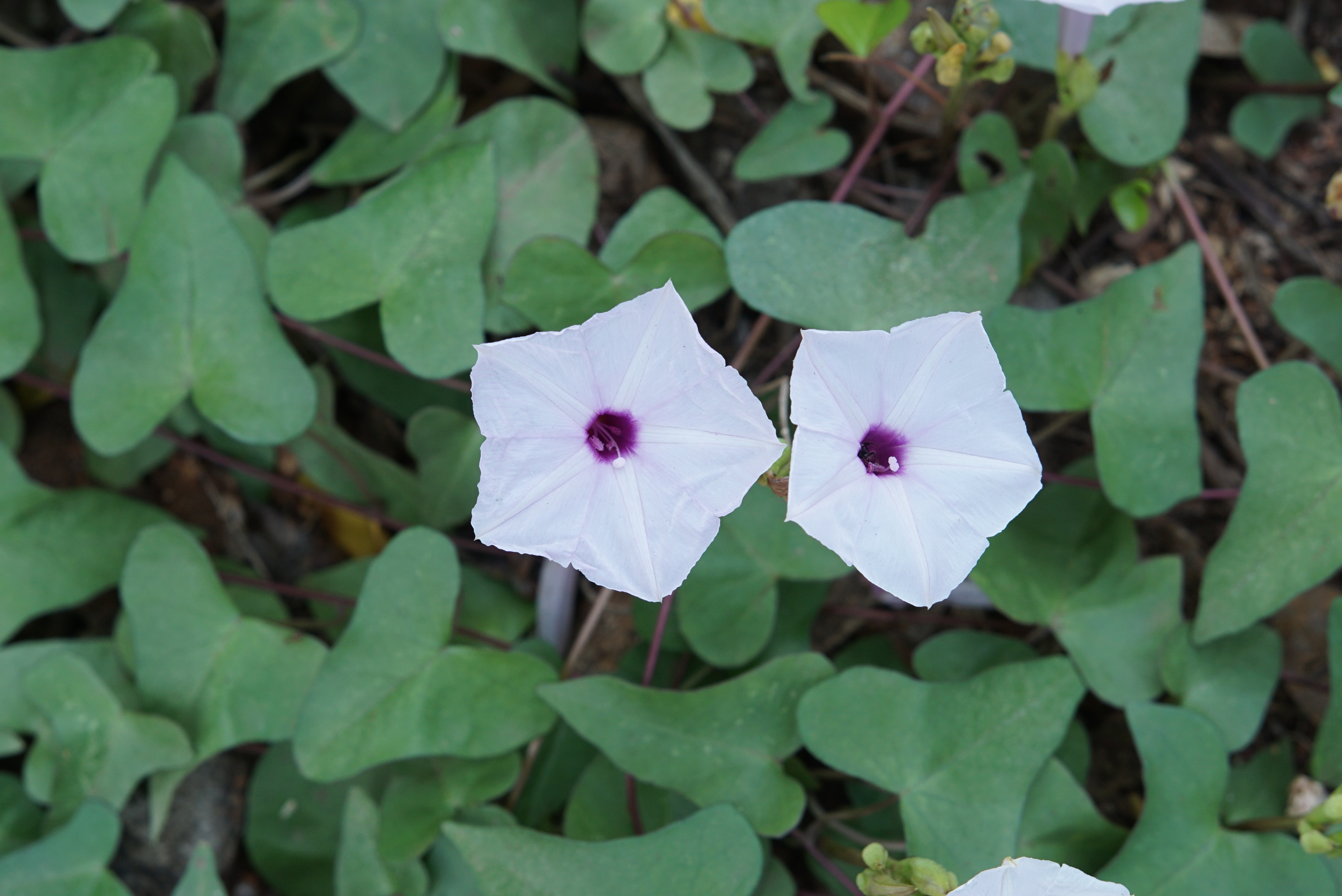

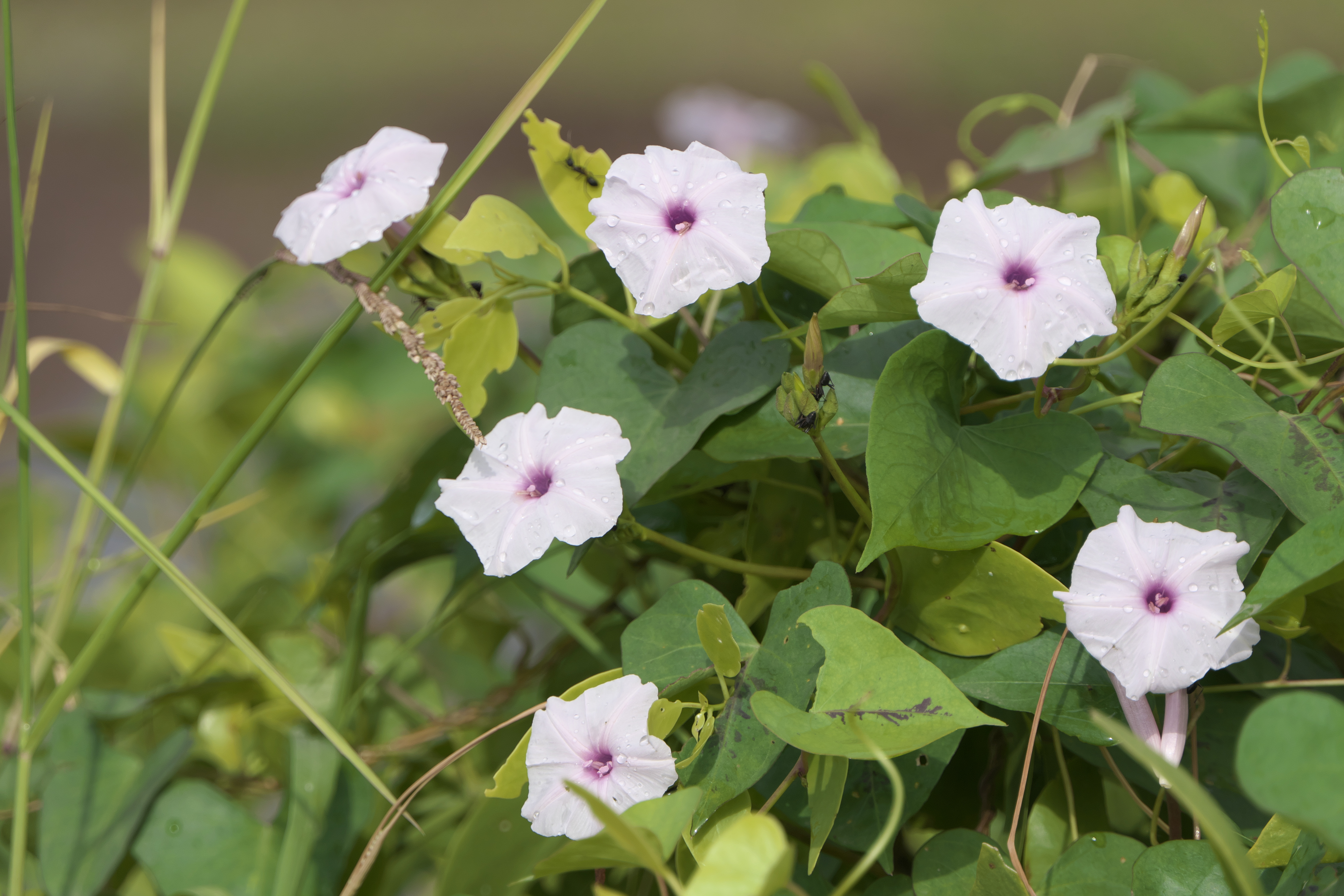

Scientific classification
- Kingdom: Plantae
- Clade: Tracheophytes
- Clade: Angiosperms
- Clade: Eudicots
- Clade: Asterids
- Order: Solanales
- Family: Convolvulaceae
- Genus: Ipomoea
- Species: I. sagittifolia

Binomial name
- Ipomoea sagittifolia Burm.f.

Synonyms
- Ipomoea hastata L.
- Quamoclit hastata G.Don
- Quamoclit sagittifolia (Burm.f.) Choisy
- Batatas abyssinica A.Rich.
- Convolvulus diversifolius Schumach. & Thonn.
- Convolvulus incrassatus Wall.
- Convolvulus javanicus Burm.f.
- Convolvulus javanicus Spreng.
- Convolvulus marginatus Desr.
- Convolvulus sepiarius Wall.
- Convolvulus stipulaceus Roxb.
- Convolvulus trianthus Spreng.
- Convolvulus verrucosus (Blume) D.Dietr.
- Ipomoea britteniana Rendle
- Ipomoea diversifolia (Schumach. & Thonn.) Didr.
- Ipomoea hellebarda var. sarcopoda Welw. ex Hiern
- Ipomoea homblei De Wild.
- Ipomoea marginata (Desr.) Manitz
- Ipomoea marginata f. candida (Naik & Zate) Das Das & Lakshmin.
- Ipomoea marginata var. stipulacea (Roxb.) M.R.Almeida
- Ipomoea maxima Anon.
- Ipomoea maxima f. candida Naik & Zate
- Ipomoea maxima var. sagittata Verdc.
- Ipomoea sagittata var. diversifolia Choisy
- Ipomoea sepiaria J.König ex Roxb.
- Ipomoea sepiaria var. sagittata Choisy
- Ipomoea sepiaria var. stipulacea (Roxb.) C.B.Clarke
- Ipomoea sphaerica Choisy
- Ipomoea stipulacea (Roxb.) Sweet
- Ipomoea subtrilobans Miq.
- Ipomoea verrucosa Blume
- Merremia hastifolia A.Chev.
- Tirtalia maxima Raf.
- Tirtalia striata Raf.

= Ipomoea sagittifolia =

Species of flowering plant

Ipomoea sagittifolia is a species of morning glory in the genus Ipomoea. It is native to Africa, India, the Malay Archipelago, and Australia. It was erroneously reported to occur in Taiwan.

== Physiology ==
=== Alkaloids ===
It is used in traditional Indian medicine because its seeds contains the indole alkaloids ipobscurine A, B, and C.
