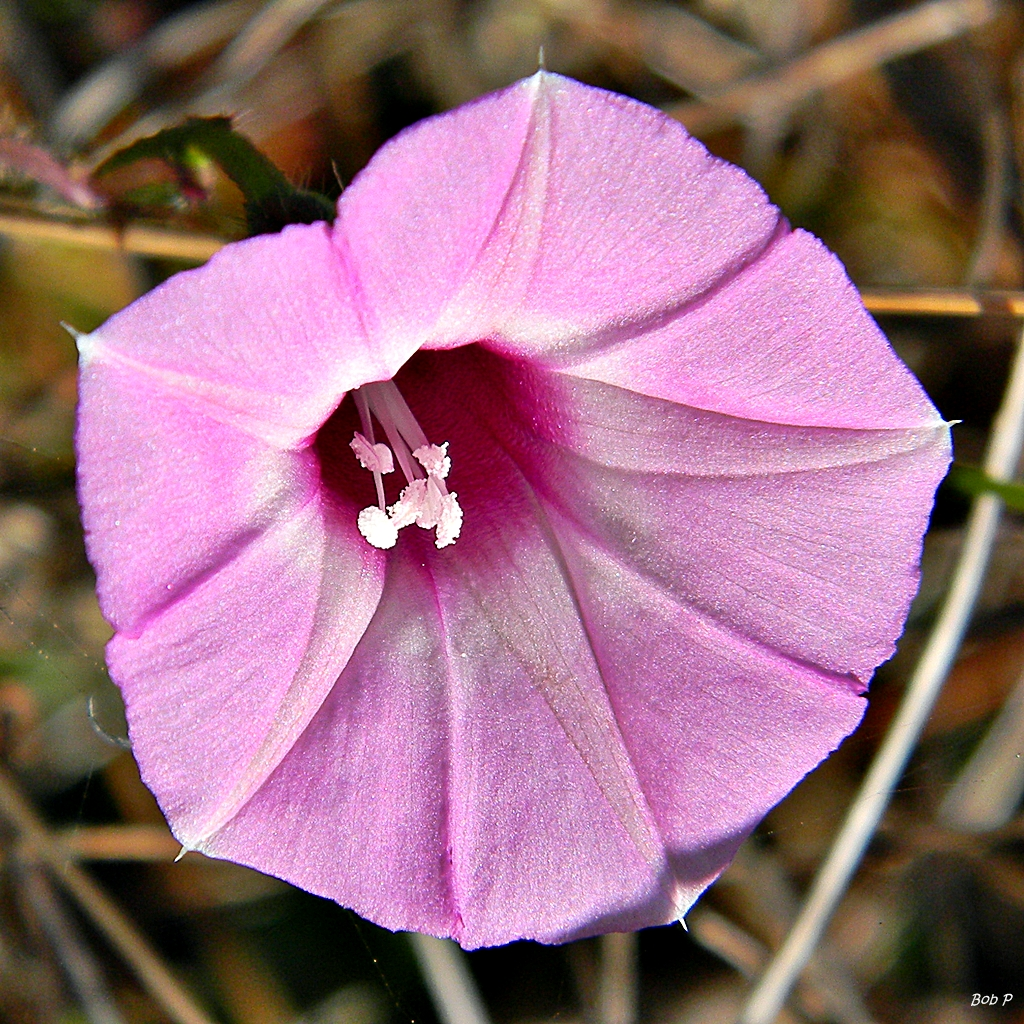

Conservation status
- Secure (NatureServe)

Scientific classification
- Kingdom: Plantae
- Clade: Tracheophytes
- Clade: Angiosperms
- Clade: Eudicots
- Clade: Asterids
- Order: Solanales
- Family: Convolvulaceae
- Genus: Ipomoea
- Species: I. cordatotriloba

Binomial name
- Ipomoea cordatotriloba Dennst.
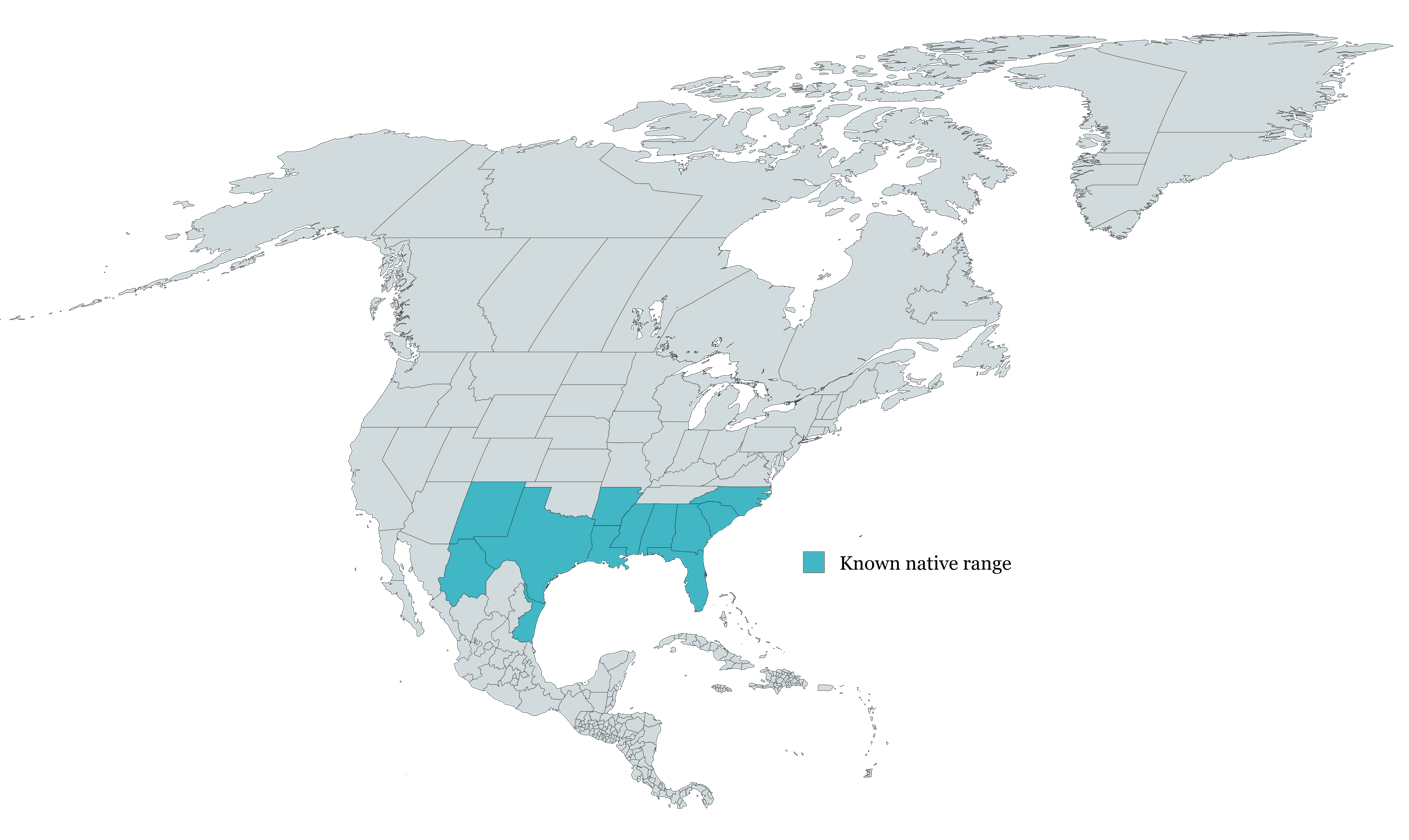

= Ipomoea cordatotriloba =

Species of flowering plant

Ipomoea cordatotriloba is a species of morning glory native to the southeastern United States and Mexico. Its common names include tievine and cotton morning glory.

== Description ==
I. cordatotriloba is an annual herb and can reach 5-6 ft (1.5-2 m) in height, with a maximum vine length of 15 ft (5 m). Its purple and pink flowers typically bloom from July to October.

The leaves usually have three lobes but can have five as well. The center lobe pinches inward at the base. It has a muricate pedicel and the seeds have short hairs.

== Distribution and ecology ==
The confirmed range of I. cordatotriloba includes Alabama, Arkansas, Chihuahua, Florida, Georgia, Louisiana, Mississippi, New Mexico, North Carolina, South Carolina, Tamaulipas, and Texas.

I. cordatotriloba is "rare in truly natural habitats" and does well in disturbed soil and along roadsides. The species requires little water and has a tendency to spread. It is usually found in lowlands below elevations of 1000 m.

== Taxonomy ==
The species was first described by Carl Linnaeus in 1753 as Convolvulus carolinus. It was reclassified as Ipomoea by German botanist August Wilhelm Dennstedt in 1810; there already existed an I. carolina, so the species was renamed to I. cordatotriloba.

There are two varieties:

- I. cordatotriloba var. cordatotriloba – sharppod morning glory
- I. cordatotriloba var. torreyana – Torrey's tievine

I. australis, formerly considered a variety of I. cordatotriloba, was designated as its own species in 2020. Unlike I. cordatotriloba, I. australis rarely has three-lobed leaves, and its pedicel and seeds are smooth. I. cordatotriloba is exclusively found in the Northern Hemisphere and I. australis is exclusively found in the Southern Hemisphere.

I. cordatotriloba is closely related to the sweet potato, I. batatas, and is considered part of the Batatas clade of Ipomoea.

== Gallery ==
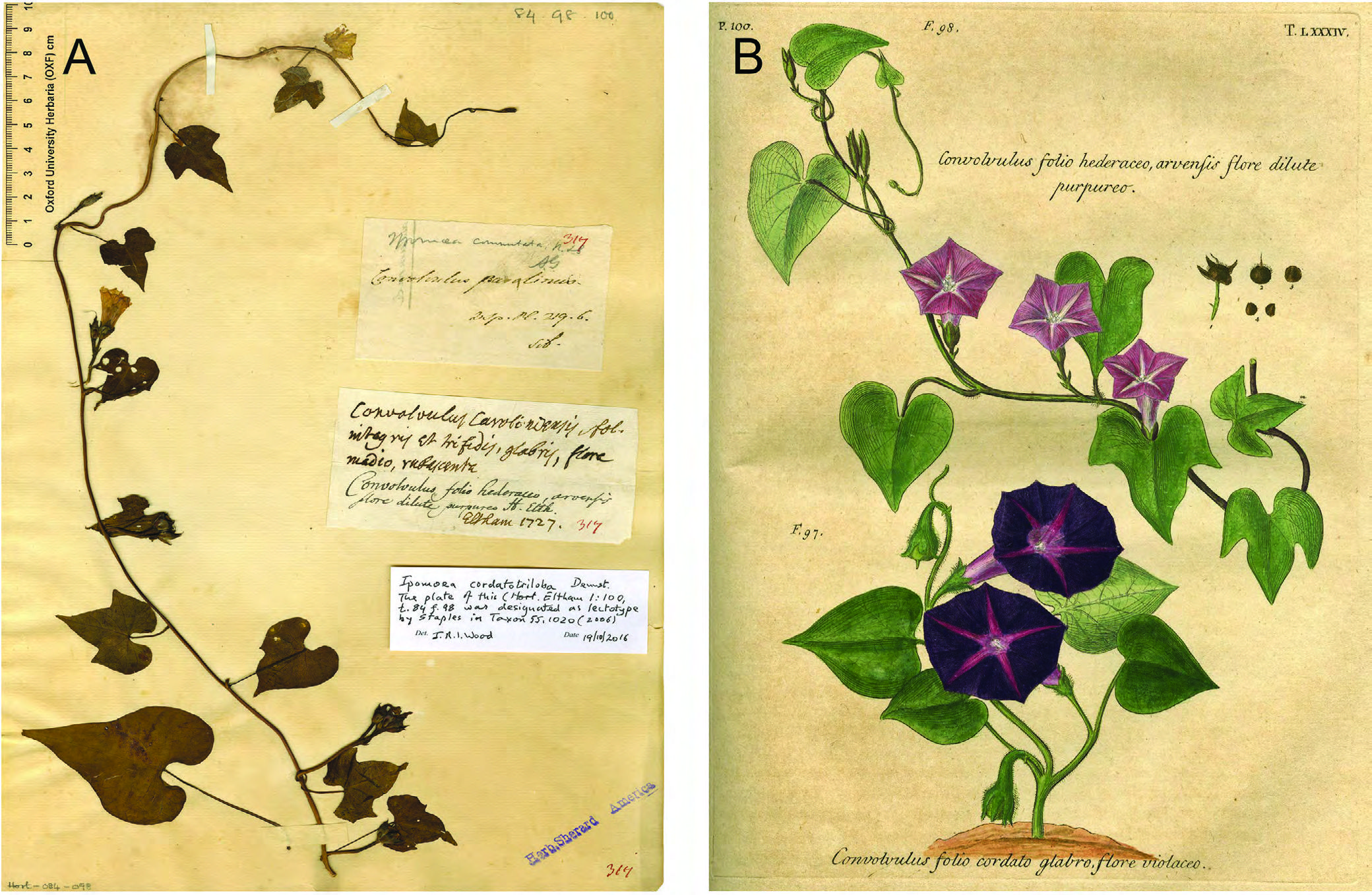
Lectotype of Convolvulus carolinus (=Ipomoea cordatotriloba). Specimen collected by Johann Jacob Dillenius in 1727. The top right figure depicts Ipomoea cordatotriloba and the bottom right figure depicts Ipomoea purpurea.

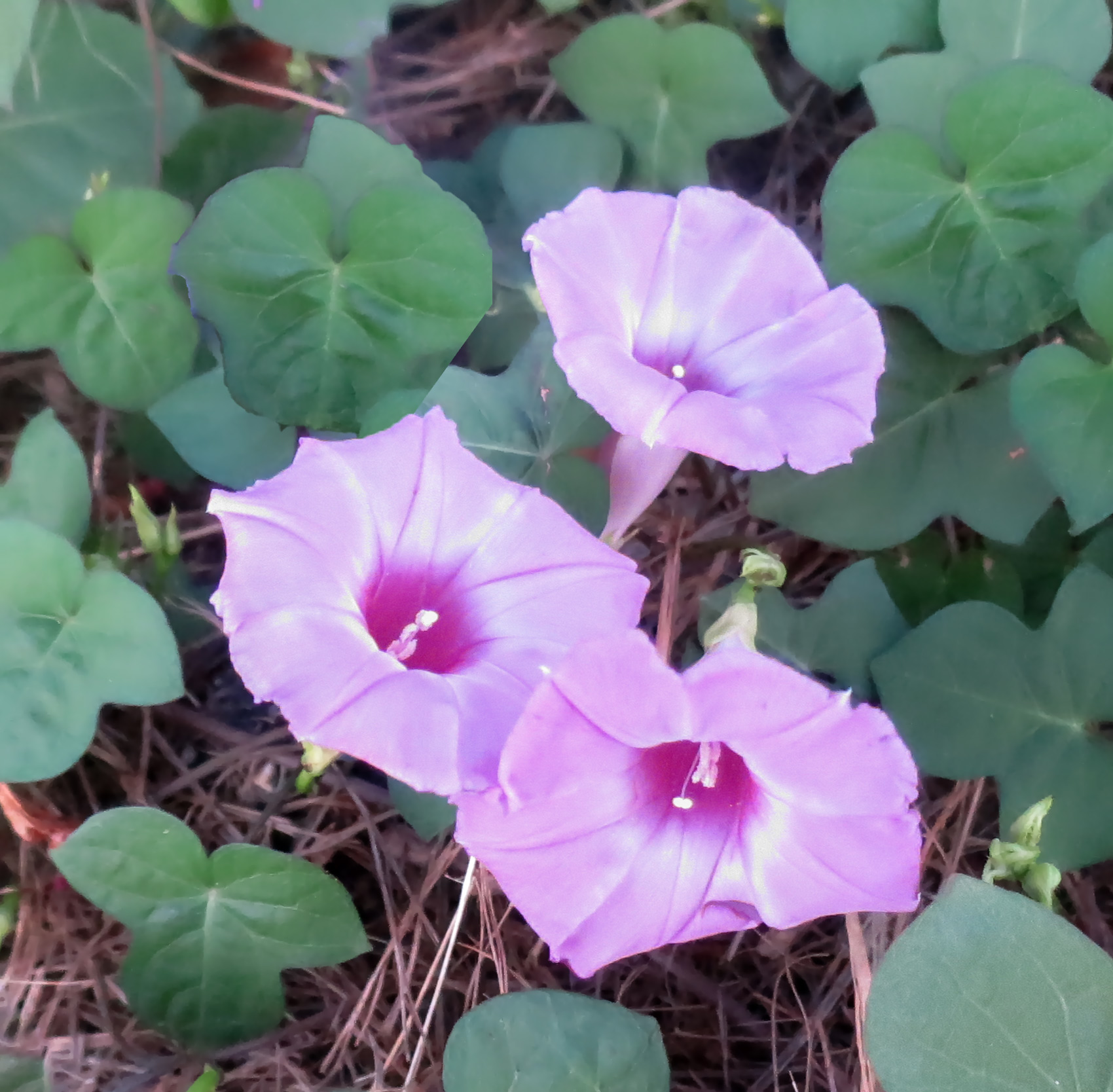
Ipomoea cordatotriloba found just north of Clear Lake and south of Houston in Texas.

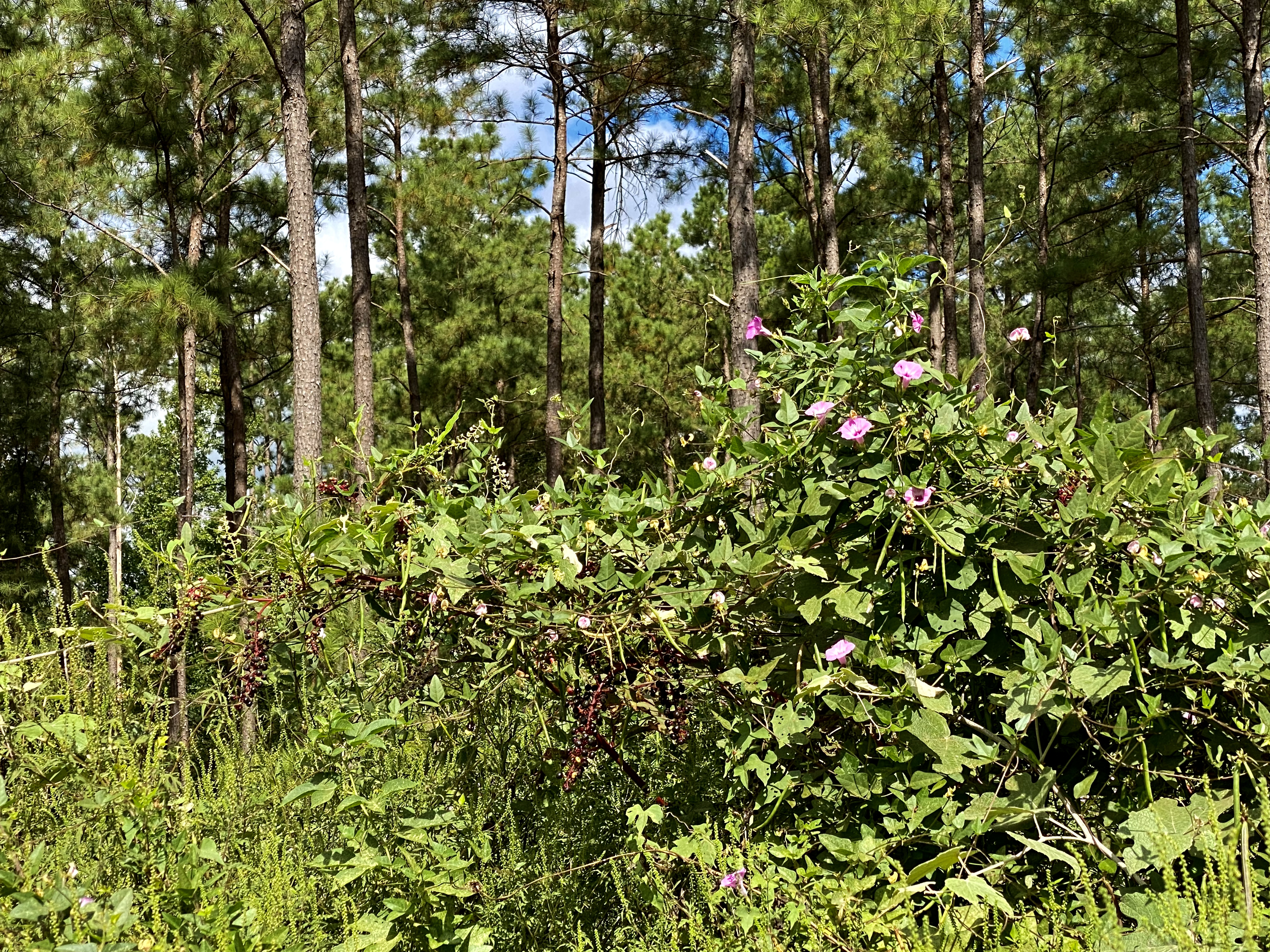
Various herbaceous plants, including Ipomoea cordatotriloba, entangled on a roadside fence in Anderson County.
