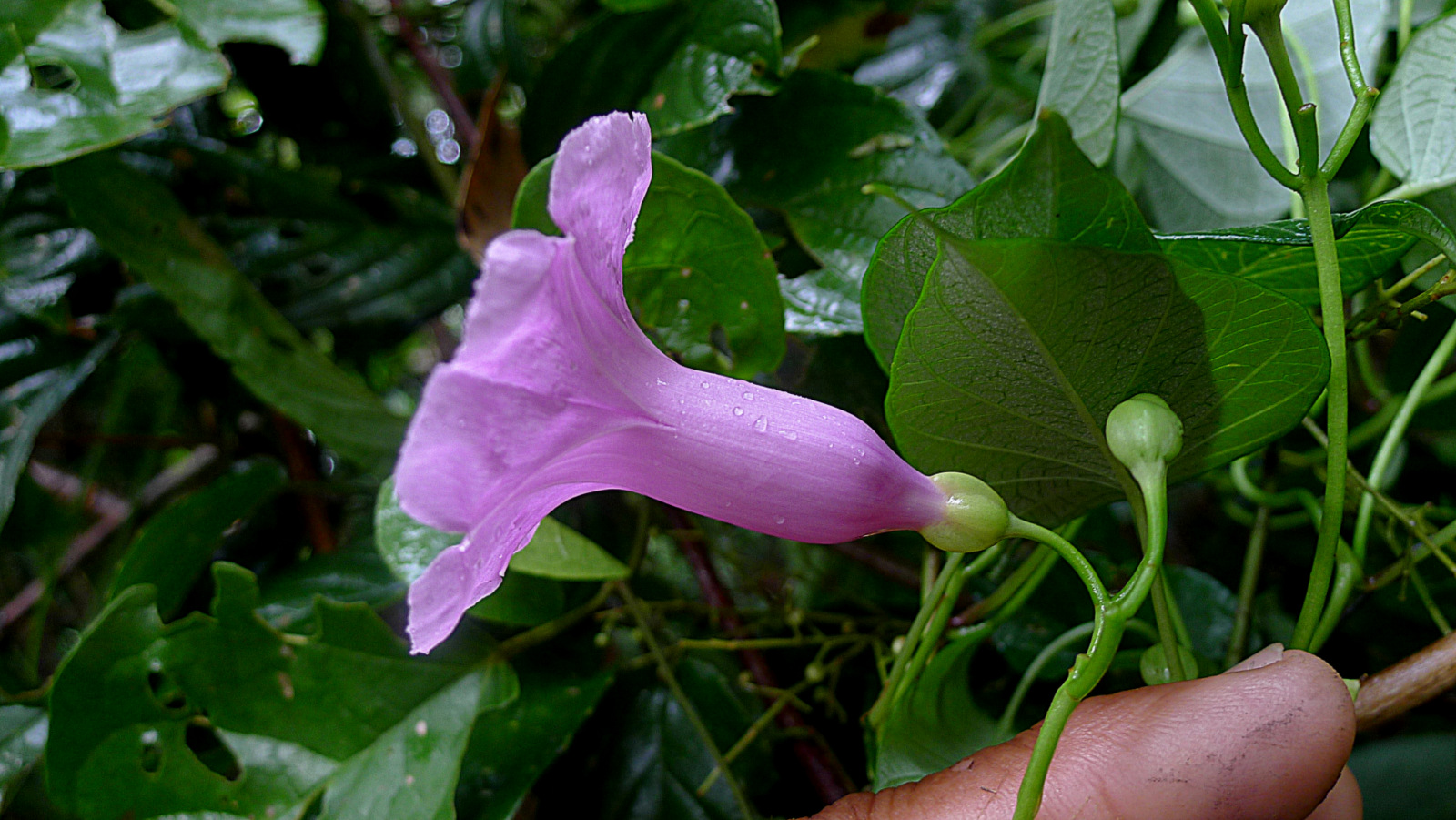

Scientific classification
- Kingdom: Plantae
- Clade: Tracheophytes
- Clade: Angiosperms
- Clade: Eudicots
- Clade: Asterids
- Order: Solanales
- Family: Convolvulaceae
- Genus: Ipomoea
- Species: I. batatoides

Binomial name
- Ipomoea batatoides Choisy

Synonyms
- Convolvulus pseudomina Kuntze; Ipomoea distans Choisy; Ipomoea glabriuscula House; Ipomoea microsticta Hallier fil.; Ipomoea philipsonii O'Donell; Ipomoea pseudomina K.Schum.; Ipomoea reidelii Meisn.; Ipomoea riedelii Meisn.; Ipomoea teruae Molina & L.O.Williams

= Ipomoea batatoides =

Species of flowering plant

Ipomoea batatoides is a species of flowering plant in the family Convolvulaceae.

This species is found in sub-deciduous tropical forest, from about 100 to 200 meters above sea level. It blooms from August to November.

The species is native to Belize, Bolivia, Brazil, Colombia, Costa Rica, Ecuador, El Salvador, French Guiana, Guatemala, Guyana, Honduras, Mexico, Nicaragua, Panamá, Peru, Suriname, and Venezuela.
