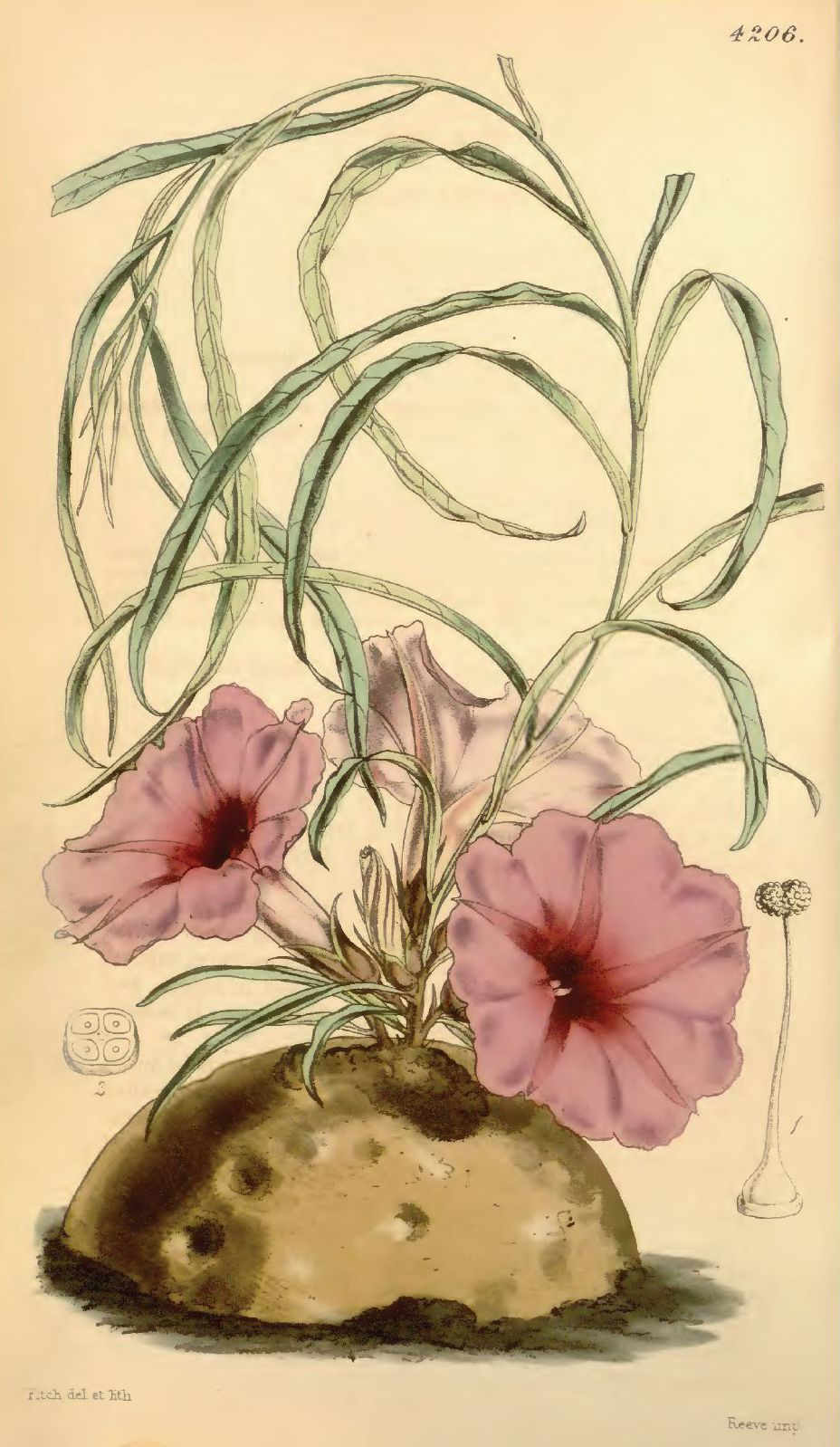
- Ipomoea simplex by Walter Hood Fitch

Scientific classification
- Kingdom: Plantae
- Clade: Tracheophytes
- Clade: Angiosperms
- Clade: Eudicots
- Clade: Asterids
- Order: Solanales
- Family: Convolvulaceae
- Genus: Ipomoea
- Species: I. simplex

Binomial name
- Ipomoea simplex Thunb.

= Ipomoea simplex =

Species of flowering plant

Ipomoea simplex is a central and eastern Southern African grassland species of Convolvulaceae or Sweet Potato family, notable for its large tuber or root, often eaten raw by Xhosa and Sotho herd boys. Carl Peter Thunberg first described this species in the Prodromus Plantarum Capensium of 1794. 'Ipomoea' = 'worm-like', in reference to the twining habit of the genus.

The Earl of Derby presented Kew Gardens with a "rounded uncouth-looking tuber" in 1844, having acquired it from the Eastern Cape, and all were completely unprepared for the beauty of its flowers that appeared in July 1845. After flowering, the stems died down nearly to the tuber. The following description is taken verbatim from the plant's appearance in Curtis's Botanical Magazine of 1846:

Root a solitary tuber, larger than a good-sized apple, subglobose. Stems from six inches to a foot long, slender, suberect, but feeble and scarcely able to support themselves, woody at the base and there more or less divided, glabrous, as is every part of the plant. Leaves alternate, nearly sessile, three, four, or more inches long, narrow almost linear-lanceolate, tapering at both extremities, frequently recurved, the margins waved, quite entire. Flowers large, handsome, from the lower part of the stem, each on a short peduncle. Calyx of five broadly lanceolate, acuminated, and at the apex somewhat recurved, sepals. Corolla large, fine rose-colour: the tube slightly enlarged upwards and expanding into the broad spreading limb. Stamens five, inserted at the base of the tube, included, two long, and three short. Filaments subulate, downy at the base, style included. Stigma large, capitate, two-lobed, granulated

Edwin Percy Phillips in his survey of the Flora of the Leribe Plateau and environs in the Annals of the South African Museum notes that Ipomoea simplex grows in localities with sparse and uncertain rainfall, prone to fire in the dry season, harsh winter conditions, in the company of other plants with long taproots, thick tuberous roots and underground woody stems, all adaptations to the demands of their habitat. Franz Seiner came across the plant in the sands of the mid-Kalahari.
