= Ipomoea pulcherrima =

Conservation status
- Vulnerable (IUCN 2.3)

Scientific classification
- Kingdom: Plantae
- Clade: Tracheophytes
- Clade: Angiosperms
- Clade: Eudicots
- Clade: Asterids
- Order: Solanales
- Family: Convolvulaceae
- Genus: Ipomoea
- Species: I. pulcherrima

Binomial name
- Ipomoea pulcherrima Ooststr.

Species of plant

Ipomoea pulcherrima is a species of plant in the family Convolvulaceae. It is endemic to Peru.
