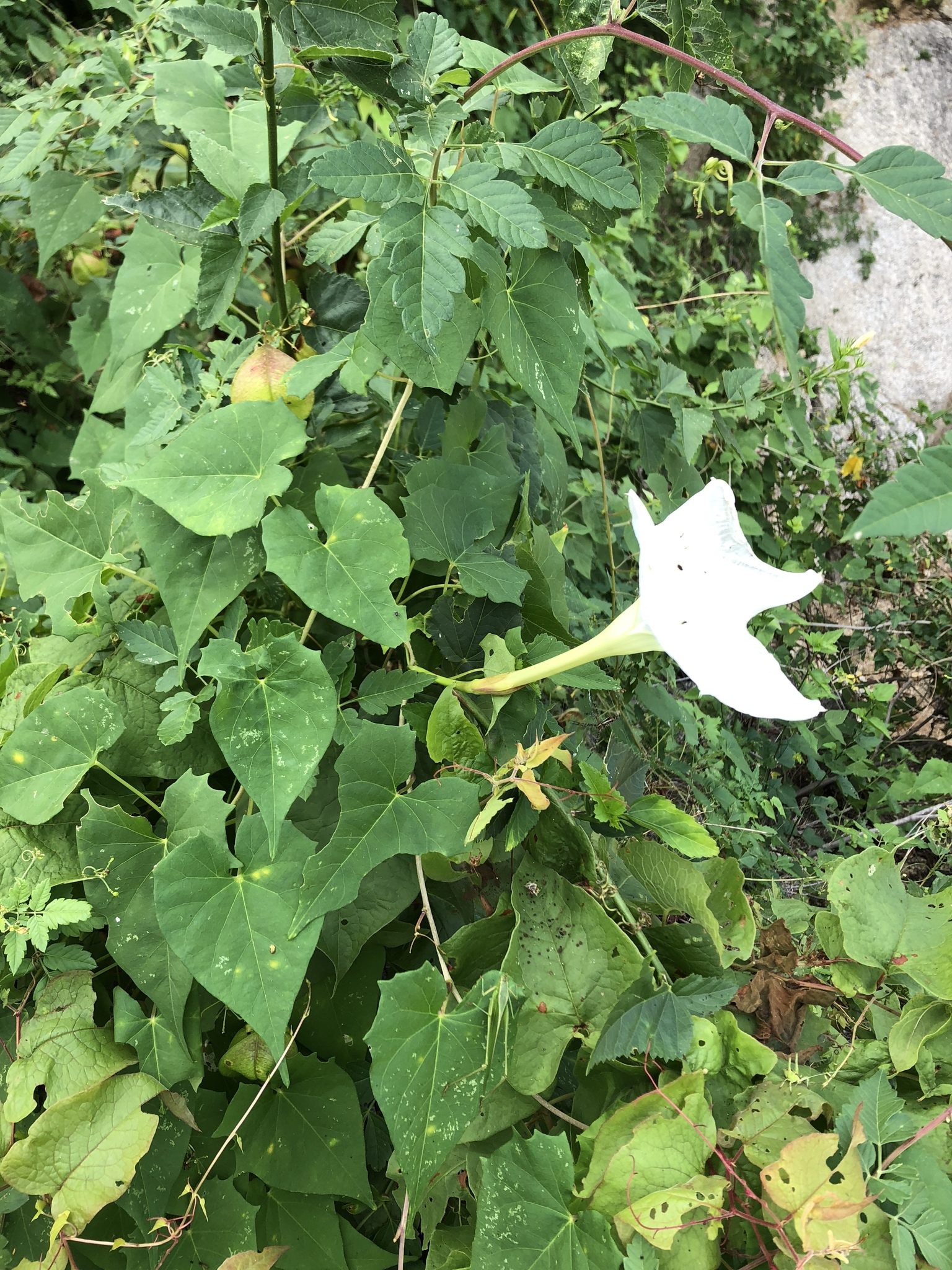

Scientific classification
- Kingdom: Plantae
- Clade: Tracheophytes
- Clade: Angiosperms
- Clade: Eudicots
- Clade: Asterids
- Order: Solanales
- Family: Convolvulaceae
- Genus: Ipomoea
- Species: I. tastensis

Binomial name
- Ipomoea tastensis Brandegee

Synonyms
- Calonyction tastense (Brandegee) House

= Ipomoea tastensis =

Species of flowering plant

Ipomoea tastensis is a species of plant in the bindweed family, Convolvulaceae. It is native to the Mexican state of Baja California Sur and are particularly abundant in the Sierra El Taste, where the white showy flowers make them a conspicuous part of the landscape.

Ipomoea tastensis is a woody vine twining over other vegetation up to a height of 10 m (33 feet). Leaves are heart-shaped, pointed at the tip, up to 8 cm (3.2 inches) long. Flowers are large, white, the corollas up to 14 cm (5.6 inches) long.
