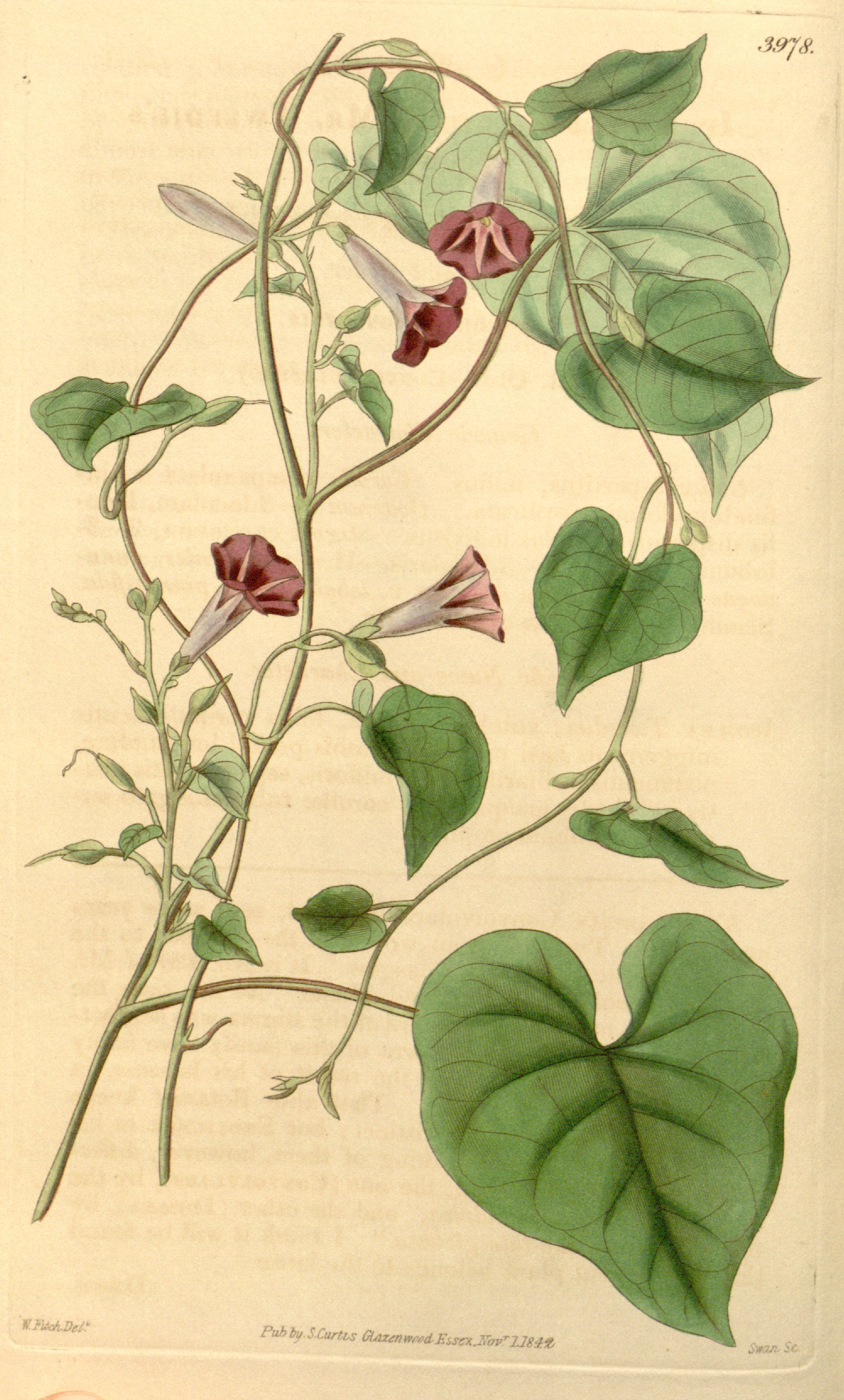

Scientific classification
- Kingdom: Plantae
- Clade: Tracheophytes
- Clade: Angiosperms
- Clade: Eudicots
- Clade: Asterids
- Order: Solanales
- Family: Convolvulaceae
- Genus: Ipomoea
- Species: I. aristolochiifolia

Binomial name
- Ipomoea aristolochiifolia G. Don.

Synonyms
- Ipomoea aristolochiaefolia (H.B.K.) Don.

= Ipomoea aristolochiifolia =

Species of flowering plant

Ipomoea aristolochiifolia is a species of plant in the family Convolvulaceae. It is endemic to parts of South America.
