= Ipomoea aurantiaca =

Scientific classification
- Kingdom: Plantae
- Clade: Tracheophytes
- Clade: Angiosperms
- Clade: Eudicots
- Clade: Asterids
- Order: Solanales
- Family: Convolvulaceae
- Genus: Ipomoea
- Species: I. aurantiaca

Binomial name
- Ipomoea aurantiaca L.O.Williams

Species of morning glory

Ipomoea aurantiaca is a species of morning glory found in Costa Rica, Mexico, Guatemala, and Nicaragua. It is a twining vine that has yellow flowers.
