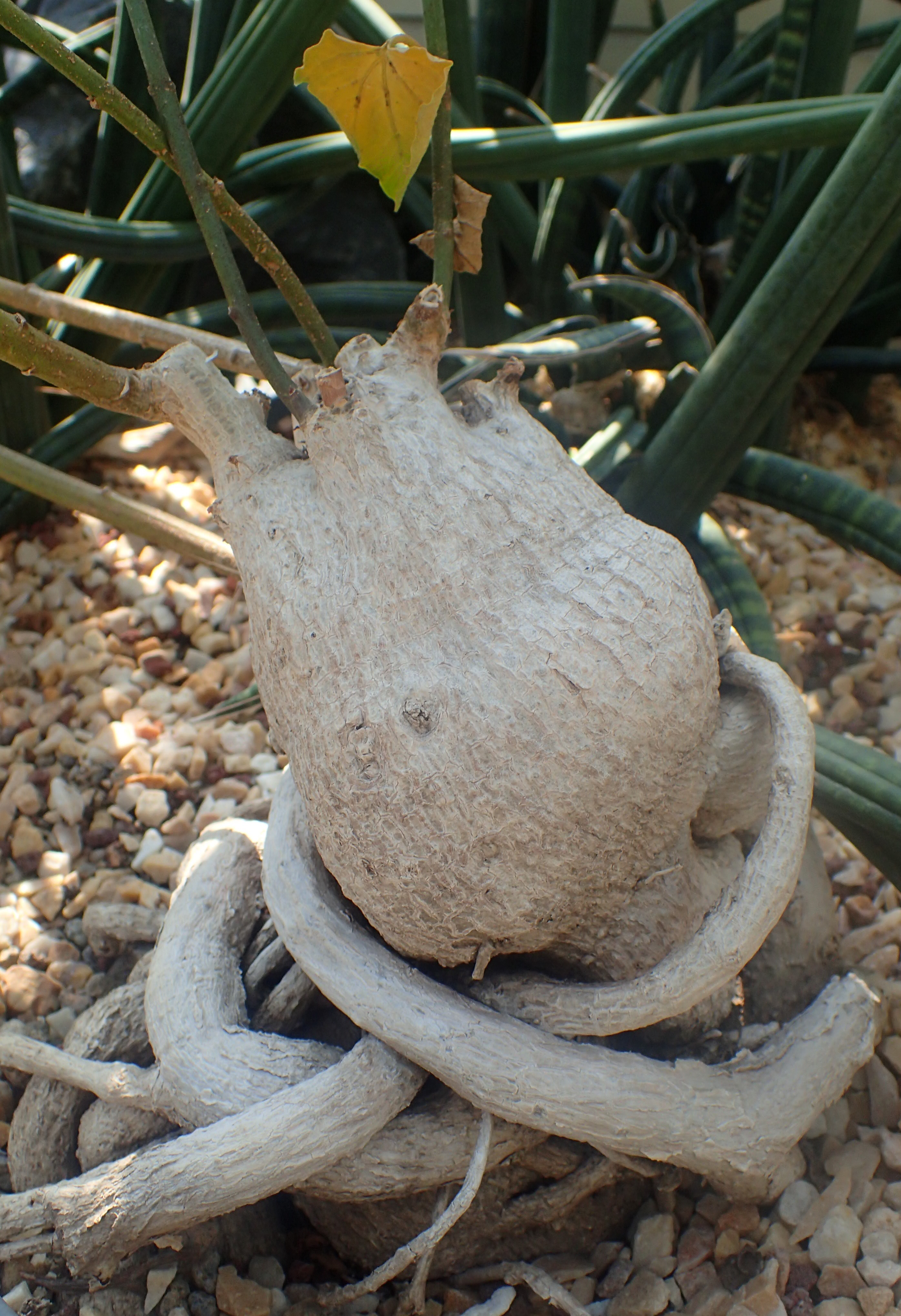

Scientific classification
- Kingdom: Plantae
- Clade: Tracheophytes
- Clade: Angiosperms
- Clade: Eudicots
- Clade: Asterids
- Order: Solanales
- Family: Convolvulaceae
- Genus: Ipomoea
- Species: I. platensis

Binomial name
- Ipomoea platensis Ker Gawl.

= Ipomoea platensis =

Species of flowering plant

Ipomoea platensis is a flowering plant species in the bindweed family (Convolvulaceae). It belongs to the morning glory genus, Ipomoea. It was first described by J. B. Ker Gawler in 1818. Native to southeastern South America, it is a popular pot plant.
