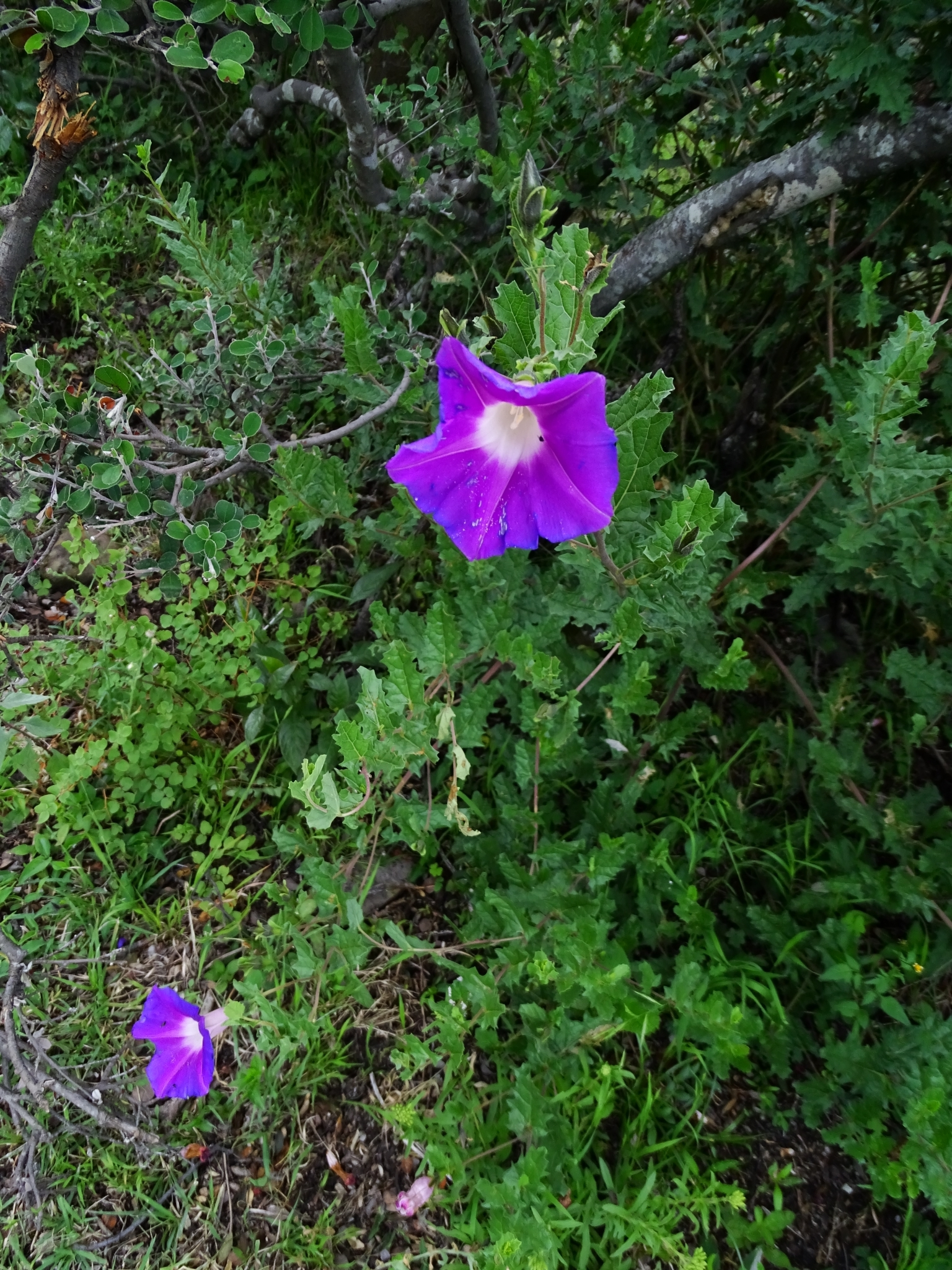

Scientific classification
- Kingdom: Plantae
- Clade: Embryophytes
- Clade: Tracheophytes
- Clade: Angiosperms
- Clade: Eudicots
- Clade: Asterids
- Order: Solanales
- Family: Convolvulaceae
- Genus: Ipomoea
- Species: I. stans

Binomial name
- Ipomoea stans Cav.

Synonyms
- Convolvulus firmus

= Ipomoea stans =

Species of flowering plant

Ipomoea stans is a species of flowering plant in the bindweed and morning glory family Convolvulaceae, that goes by the common names tumbavaqueros or espantalobos.

The species is native to Mexico where it is widely used to treat seizures and nervous disorders.
