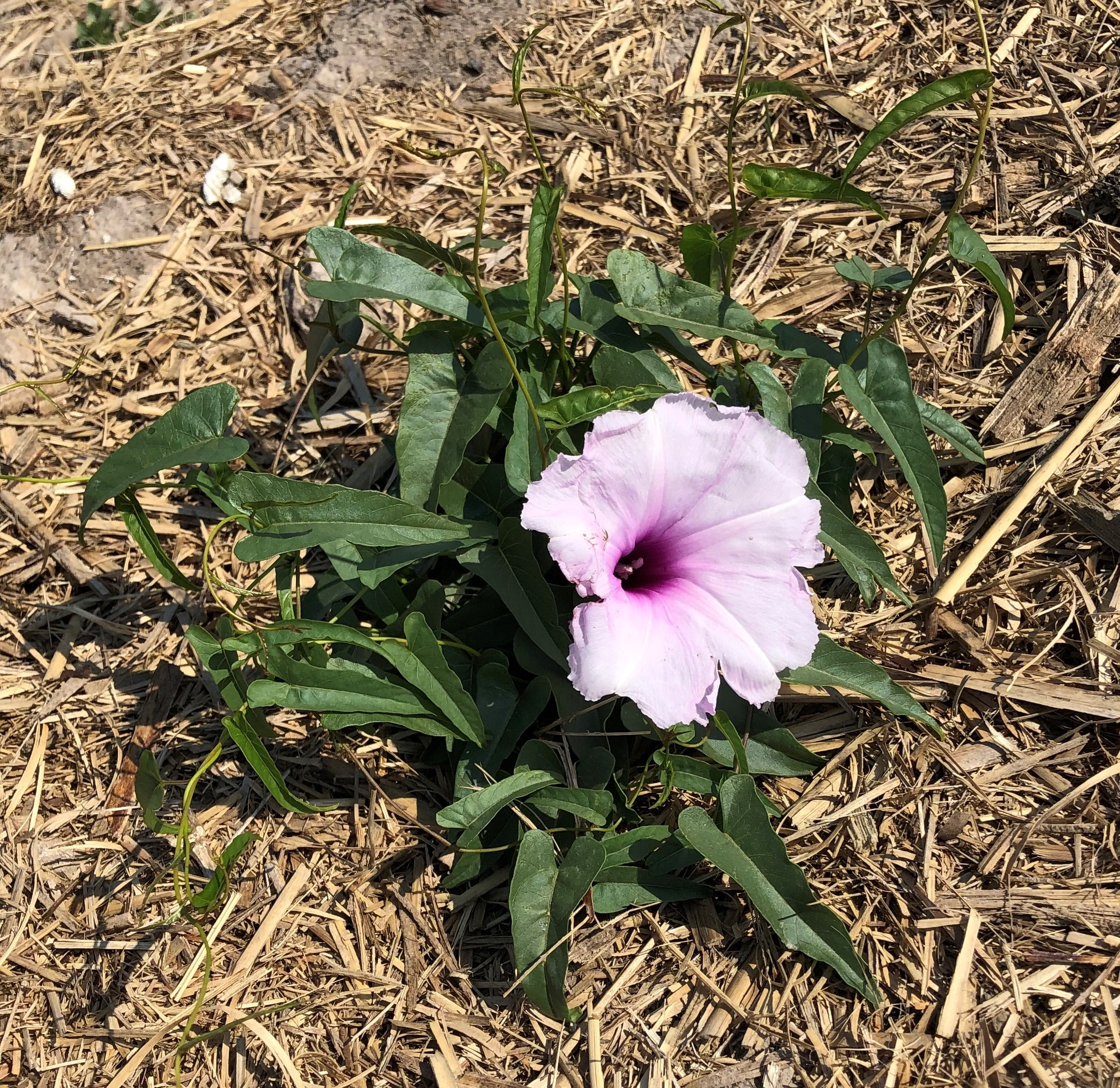

Scientific classification
- Kingdom: Plantae
- Clade: Embryophytes
- Clade: Tracheophytes
- Clade: Spermatophytes
- Clade: Angiosperms
- Clade: Eudicots
- Clade: Asterids
- Order: Solanales
- Family: Convolvulaceae
- Genus: Ipomoea
- Species: I. calobra

Binomial name
- Ipomoea calobra W.Hill & F.Muell.

= Ipomoea calobra =

Australian native plant

Ipomoea calobra, commonly known as weir vine, is an Australian native plant found in northern Australia, largely Western Australia and Queensland.

== Description ==
It is a climber growing up to 6 m high, with purple-blue-pink trumpet flowers from January to June.

== Habitat ==
It occurs on undulating plains, dunes, and hardpans in red sandy and clayey soils, and pebbly loam, and is often found twined up mulga and other acacias.

== Uses ==
The tubers of this species are edible, and were a highly favoured staple food source (bush tucker) for Indigenous Australians. The mature tubers are broadly similar nutritionally to sweet potato (Ipomoea batatas), with higher concentrations of starch, potassium (K), copper (Cu) and zinc (Zn).

== Aboriginal names ==
In some parts of Australia, I. calobra is also known to Aboriginal people by the following names:

- Murchison-Gascoyne area (WA): kulyu
- Tjupan Ngalia group (Leonora, WA): wutha/wather
