= Ipomoea chrysocalyx =

Conservation status
- Vulnerable (IUCN 3.1)

Scientific classification
- Kingdom: Plantae
- Clade: Tracheophytes
- Clade: Angiosperms
- Clade: Eudicots
- Clade: Asterids
- Order: Solanales
- Family: Convolvulaceae
- Genus: Ipomoea
- Species: I. chrysocalyx

Binomial name
- Ipomoea chrysocalyx D.F.Austin

Species of flowering plant

Ipomoea chrysocalyx is a vine in the family Convolvulaceae. It is endemic to Ecuador. Its natural habitat is subtropical or tropical dry forests.

== Taxonomy ==
It was first described in 1982 by D.F. Austin. The species epithet, chrysocalyx, is derived from the Greek chrysos ("gold") and kalyx, ("cup" or "calyx"), and describes the plant as having golden calyces.

== Threats ==
When last assessed in 2004, it was found that the population was severely fragmented with a continuing decline in mature individuals. and that there was a continuing decline in the area, extent and quality of its habitat.
