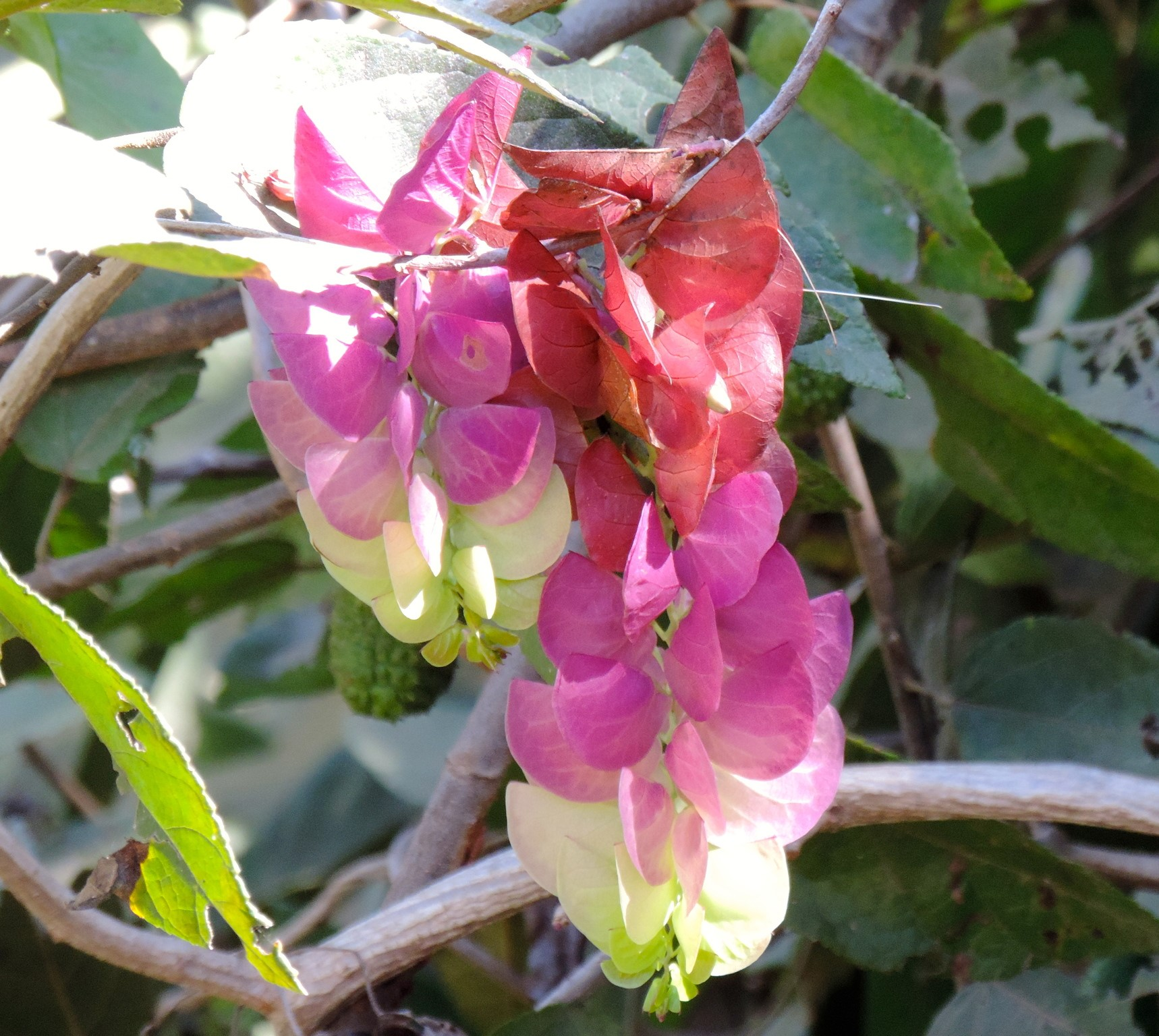

Scientific classification
- Kingdom: Plantae
- Clade: Tracheophytes
- Clade: Angiosperms
- Clade: Eudicots
- Clade: Asterids
- Order: Solanales
- Family: Convolvulaceae
- Genus: Ipomoea
- Species: I. bracteata

Binomial name
- Ipomoea bracteata Cav.

= Ipomoea bracteata =

Species of flowering plant

Ipomoea bracteata is a species of plant in the bindweed family Convolvulaceae. It is endemic to Mexico.
