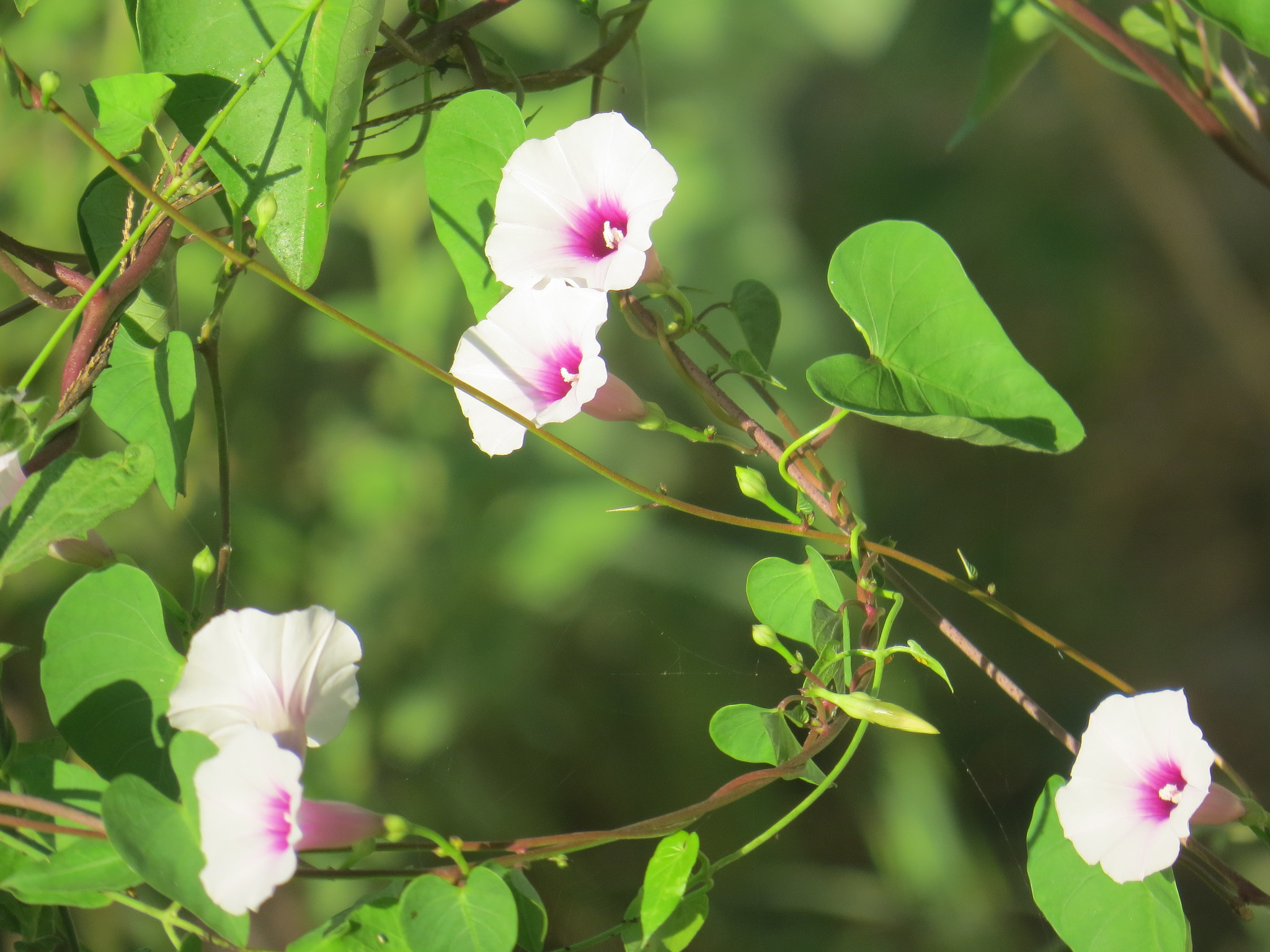

Scientific classification
- Kingdom: Plantae
- Clade: Tracheophytes
- Clade: Angiosperms
- Clade: Eudicots
- Clade: Asterids
- Order: Solanales
- Family: Convolvulaceae
- Genus: Ipomoea
- Species: I. amnicola

Binomial name
- Ipomoea amnicola Morong

= Ipomoea amnicola =

Species of flowering plant

Ipomoea amnicola is a species of plant in the bindweed family Convolvulaceae. It is commonly called redcenter morning-glory. Found in Mexico and much of South America, it has been successfully introduced in the US states of Arkansas, Missouri and Texas.
