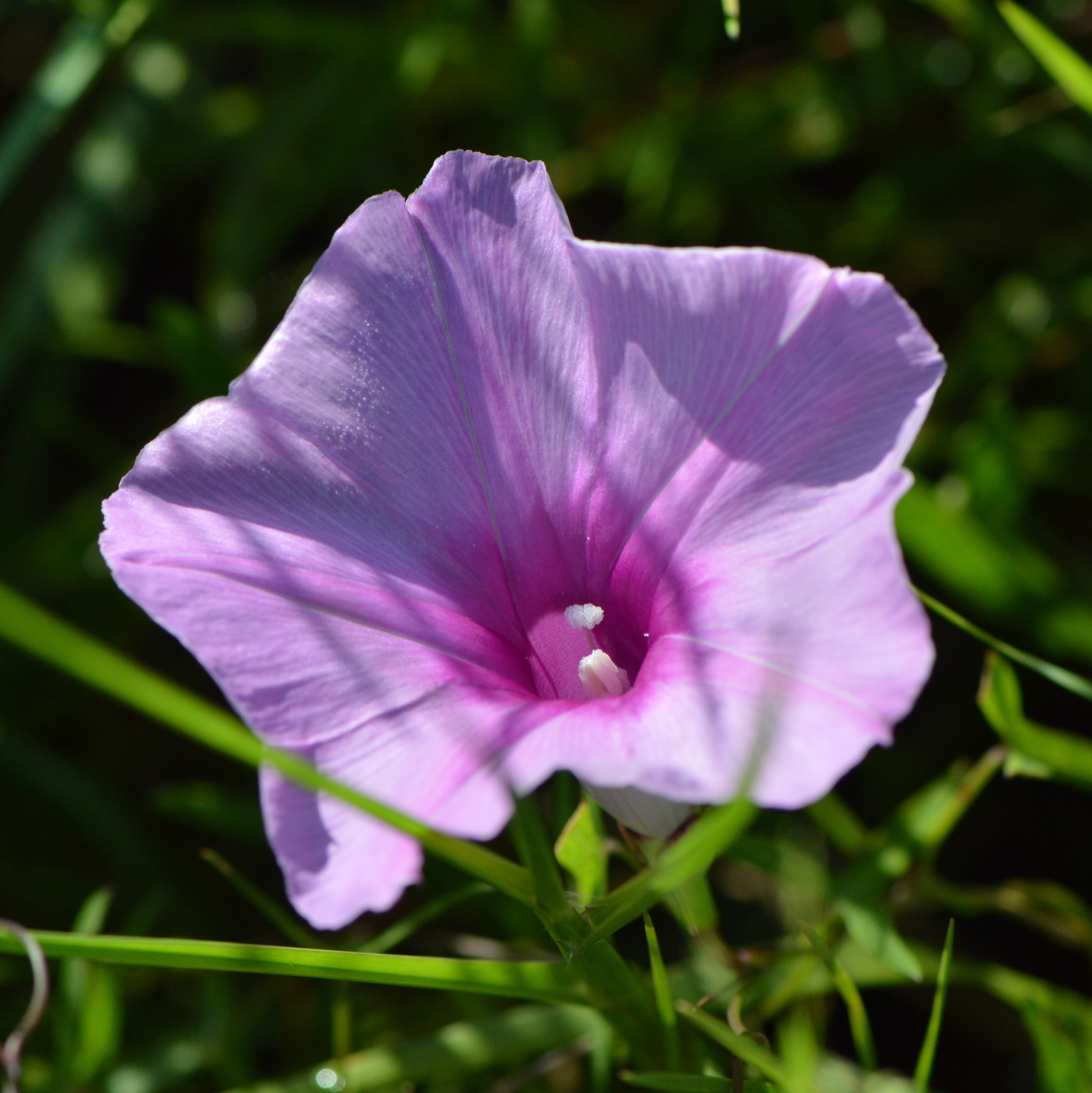
- Ipomoea sagittata, flower
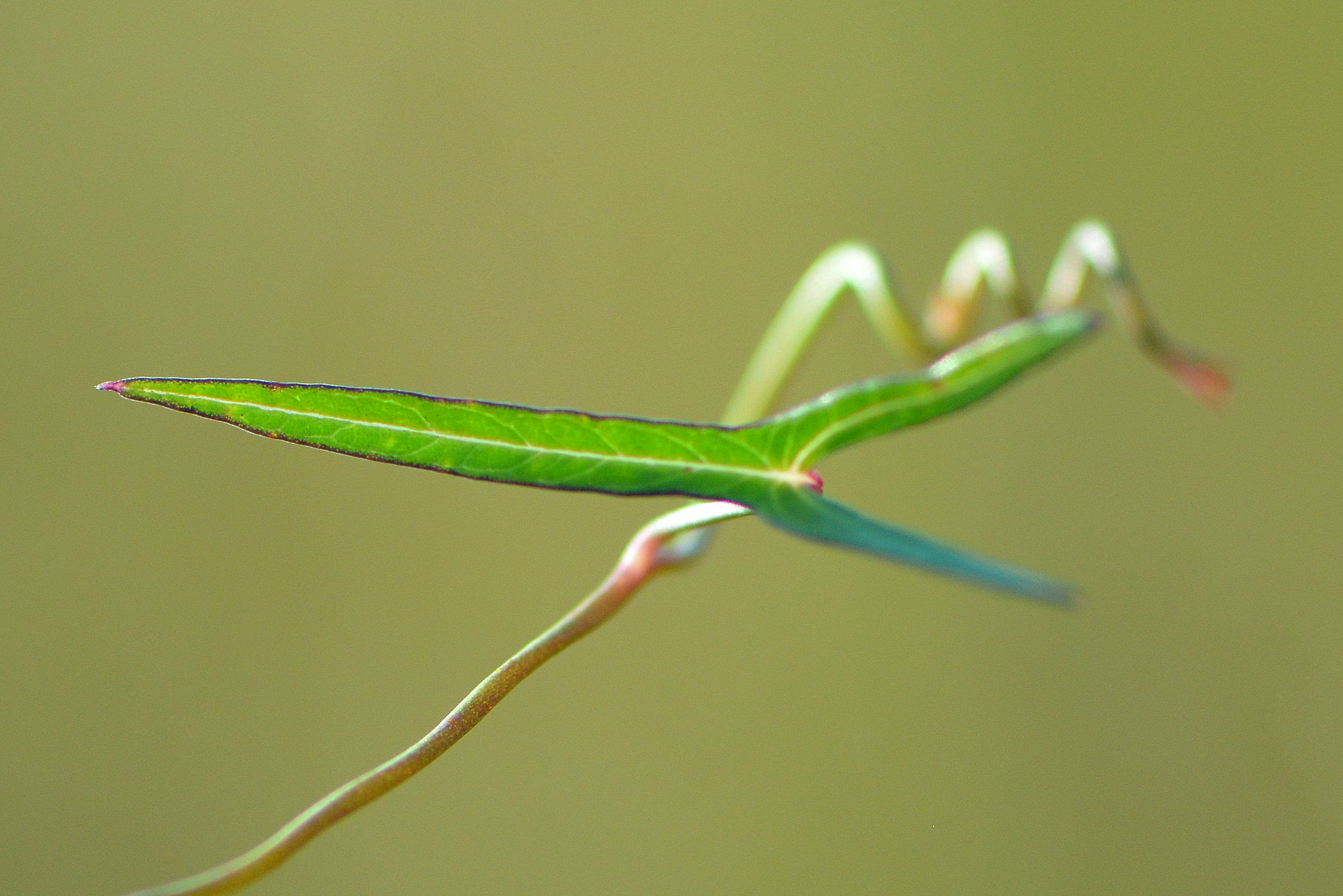
- Ipomoea sagittata, leaves

Conservation status
- Least Concern (IUCN 3.1)

Scientific classification
- Kingdom: Plantae
- Clade: Tracheophytes
- Clade: Angiosperms
- Clade: Eudicots
- Clade: Asterids
- Order: Solanales
- Family: Convolvulaceae
- Genus: Ipomoea
- Species: I. sagittata

Binomial name
- Ipomoea sagittata Poir.

= Ipomoea sagittata =

Species of flowering plant

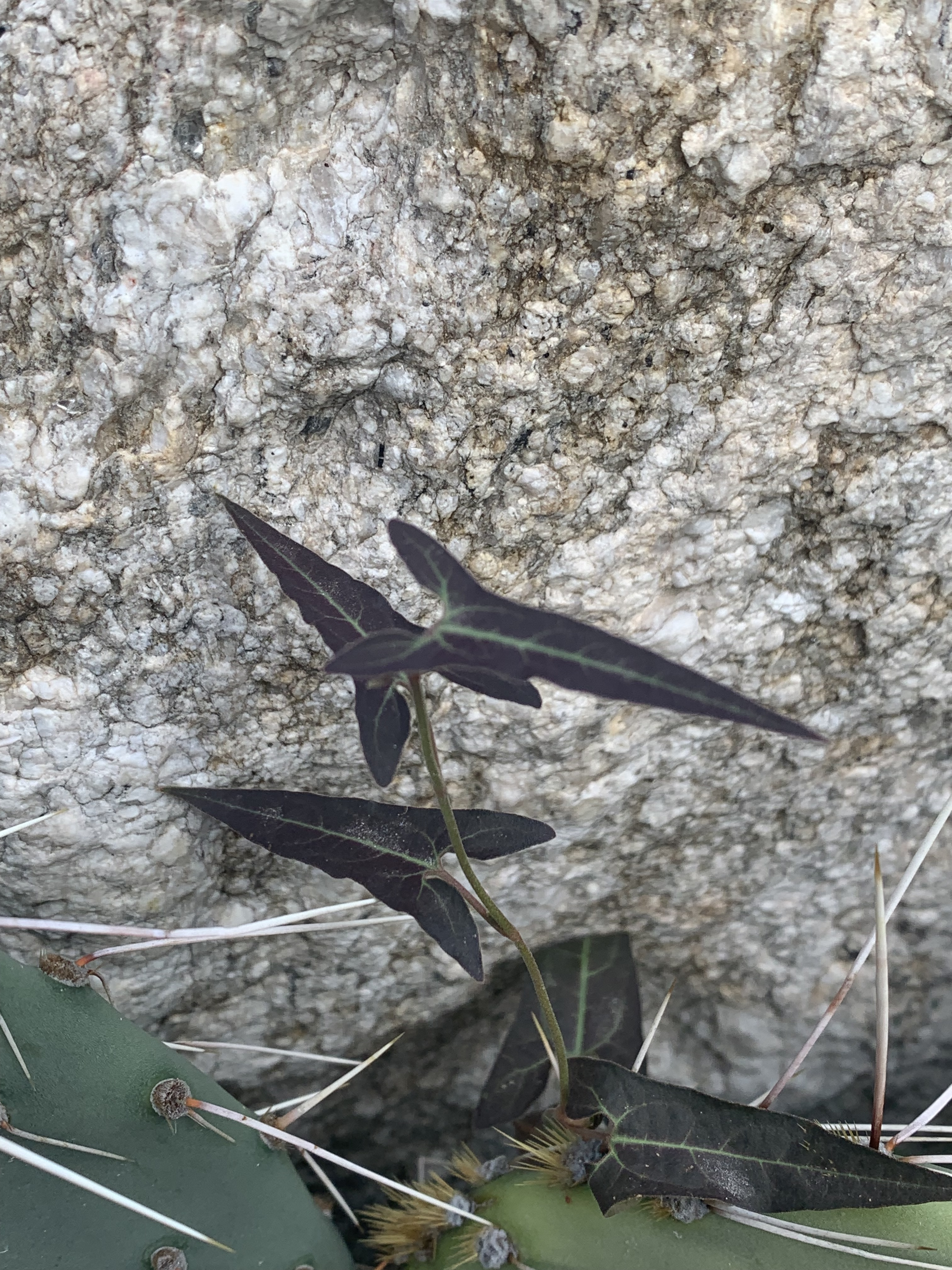
Saltmarsh morning glory found in the Sonoran Desert.

Ipomoea sagittata, commonly called the saltmarsh morning glory, is a species of flowering plant in the morning glory family. It is native to the Caribbean, Mexico, and the Southeastern United States where it is found in coastal areas. It has been introduced in the Mediterranean Basin at least since the 17th century as a result of seeds transported in ship ballast soil, the ornamental trade or its uses in medicine. This species can be found in the wild in thickets on barrier islands, the edges of salt marshes, and in hammocks.
