= Morning glory =

Common name for flowering plants in the family Convolvulaceae

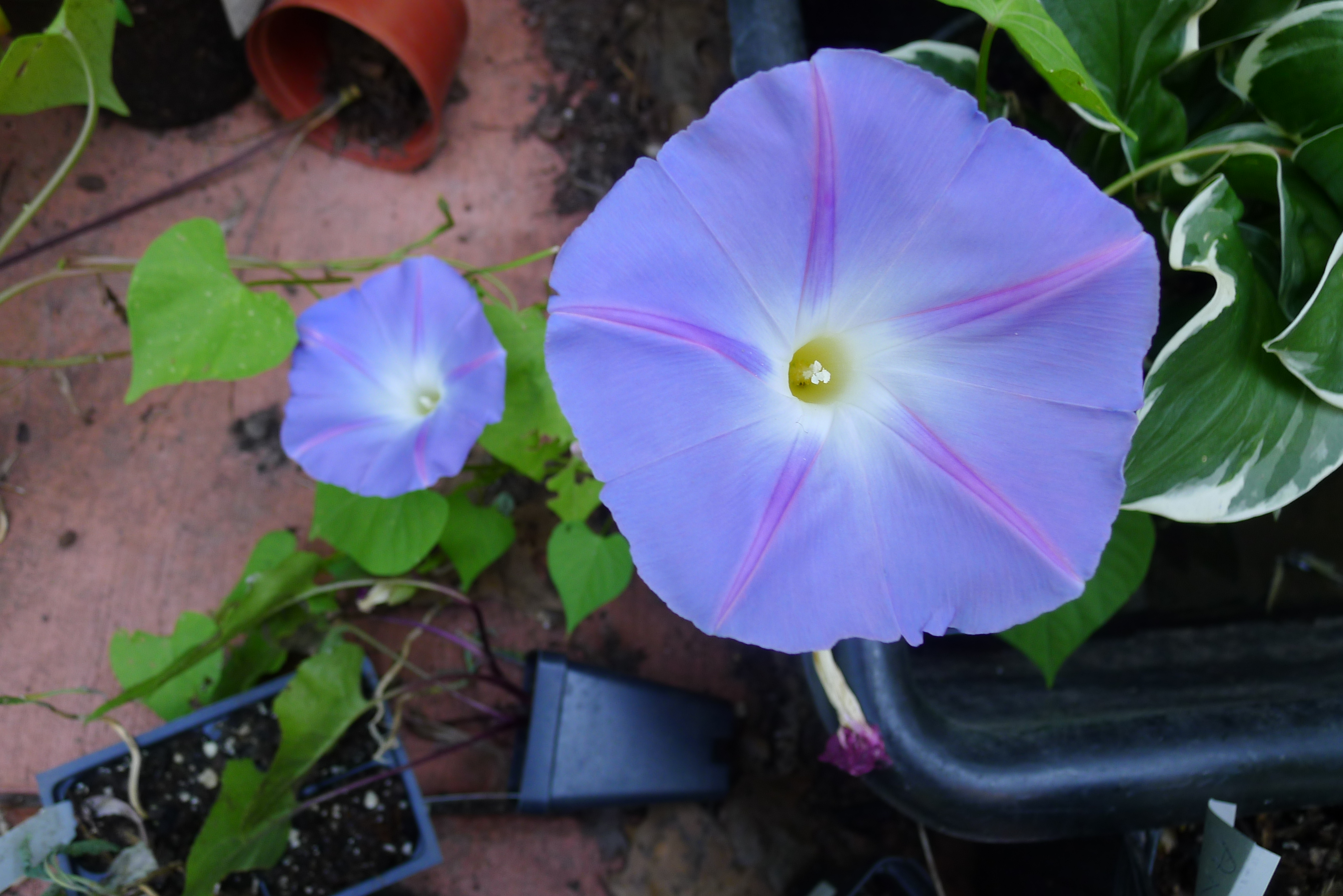
Ipomoea tricolor var. 'Heavenly Blue' has gained the Royal Horticultural Society's Award of Garden Merit

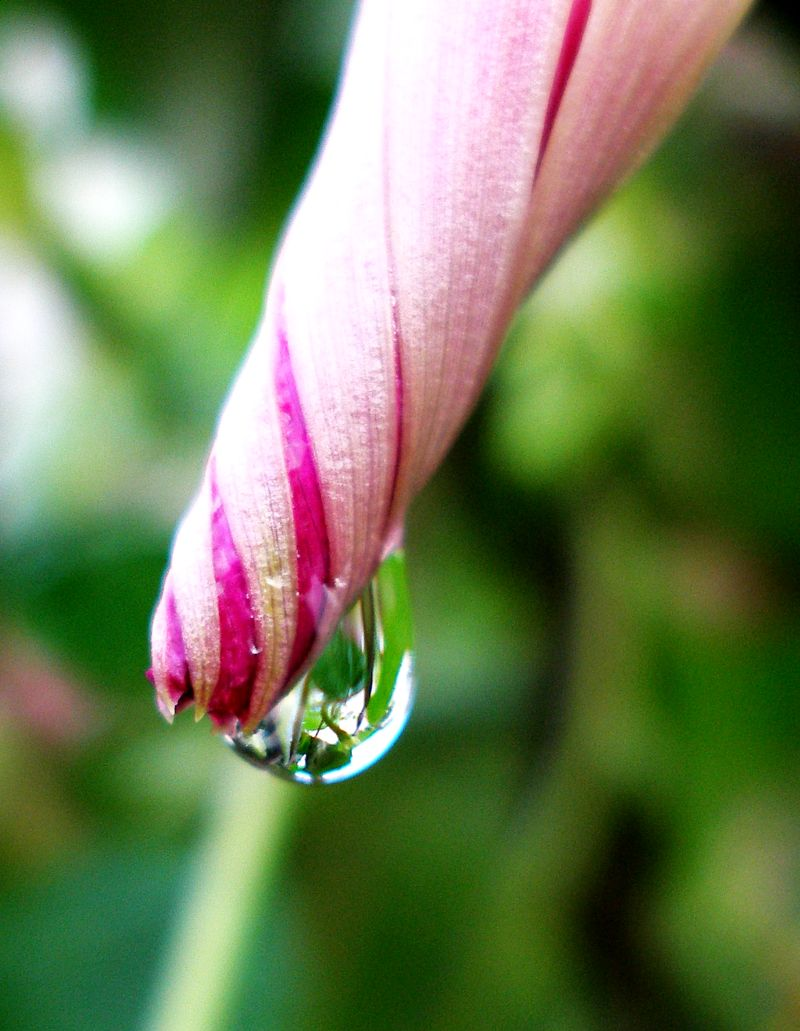
An unopened spiral bud of a morning glory flower, Ipomoea purpurea

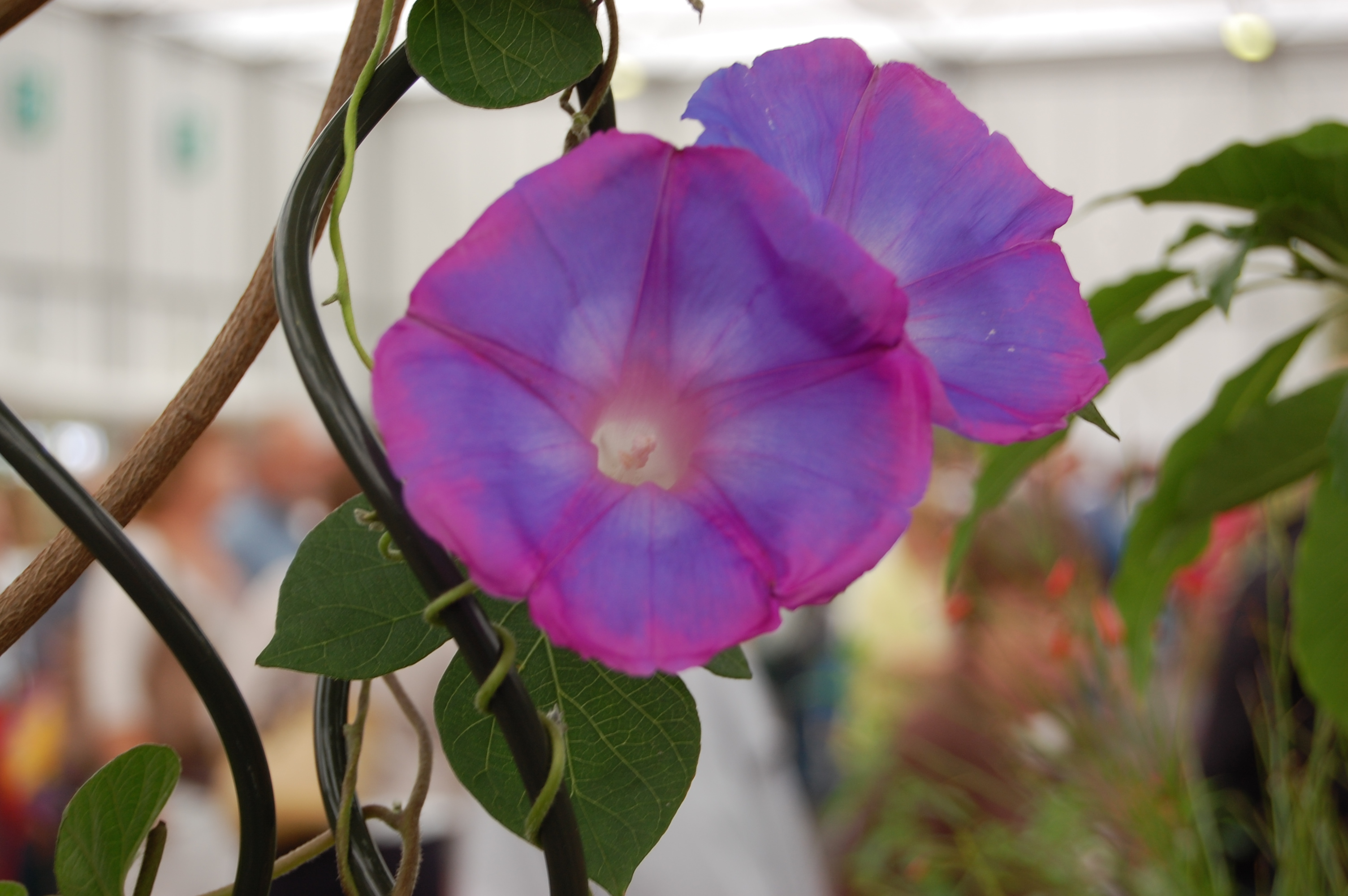
Ipomoea indica at the BBC Gardeners' World show in June 2011, with tendrils visible wrapped around the black metal support

Morning glory (also written as morning-glory) is the common name for over 1,000 species of flowering plants in the family Convolvulaceae, whose taxonomy and systematics remain in flux. These species are distributed across numerous genera, including:

- Argyreia
- Astripomoea
- Convolvulus
- Convolvulus
- Ipomoea (the largest genus)
- Lepistemon
- Merremia
- Operculina
- Rivea
- Stictocardia

Ipomoea tricolor, also commonly known simply as "morning glory", is the archetypical species for the group and is known by names such as 'Heavenly Blue', 'Flying Saucers', and 'Pearly Gates'.

As the name suggests, most morning glory flowers open early in the day, (at about 8:00 AM) and begin to fade by late morning, as the corolla starts to curl inward. They thrive in full sun and prefer mesic soils. While many species are known for their diurnal blooming pattern, some, such as Ipomoea muricata, Ipomoea alba, and Ipomoea macrorhiza, produce night-blooming flowers.

Morning glory species were historically used in China for their laxative seeds, by ancient Mesoamericans to vulcanize rubber with their sulfur-rich juice, and by Aztec priests for hallucinogenic purposes. Morning glories can become serious invasive weeds in places like Australia and the United States, where they spread rapidly, smother native plants, and are often regulated or banned due to their negative impact on agriculture and ecosystems.

Morning glories are fast-growing, twining plants often grown as perennial plants in frost-free areas and annual plants in colder climates, valued for their attractive flowers and shade-providing vines, with a long history of cultivation and selective breeding especially in Japan since the 8th century. Ipomoea aquatica, known as water spinach or water morning glory, is widely used as a green vegetable in East and Southeast Asian cuisines, though it is regulated as a noxious weed in the United States, while the genus Ipomoea also includes sweet potatoes, sometimes called tuberous morning glories. The seeds of various morning glory species contain ergoline alkaloids like ergine (LSA) and isoergine (iso-LSA), which are structurally related to LSD and can produce psychedelic effects lasting 4 to 10 hours when ingested in sufficient quantities.

== History ==
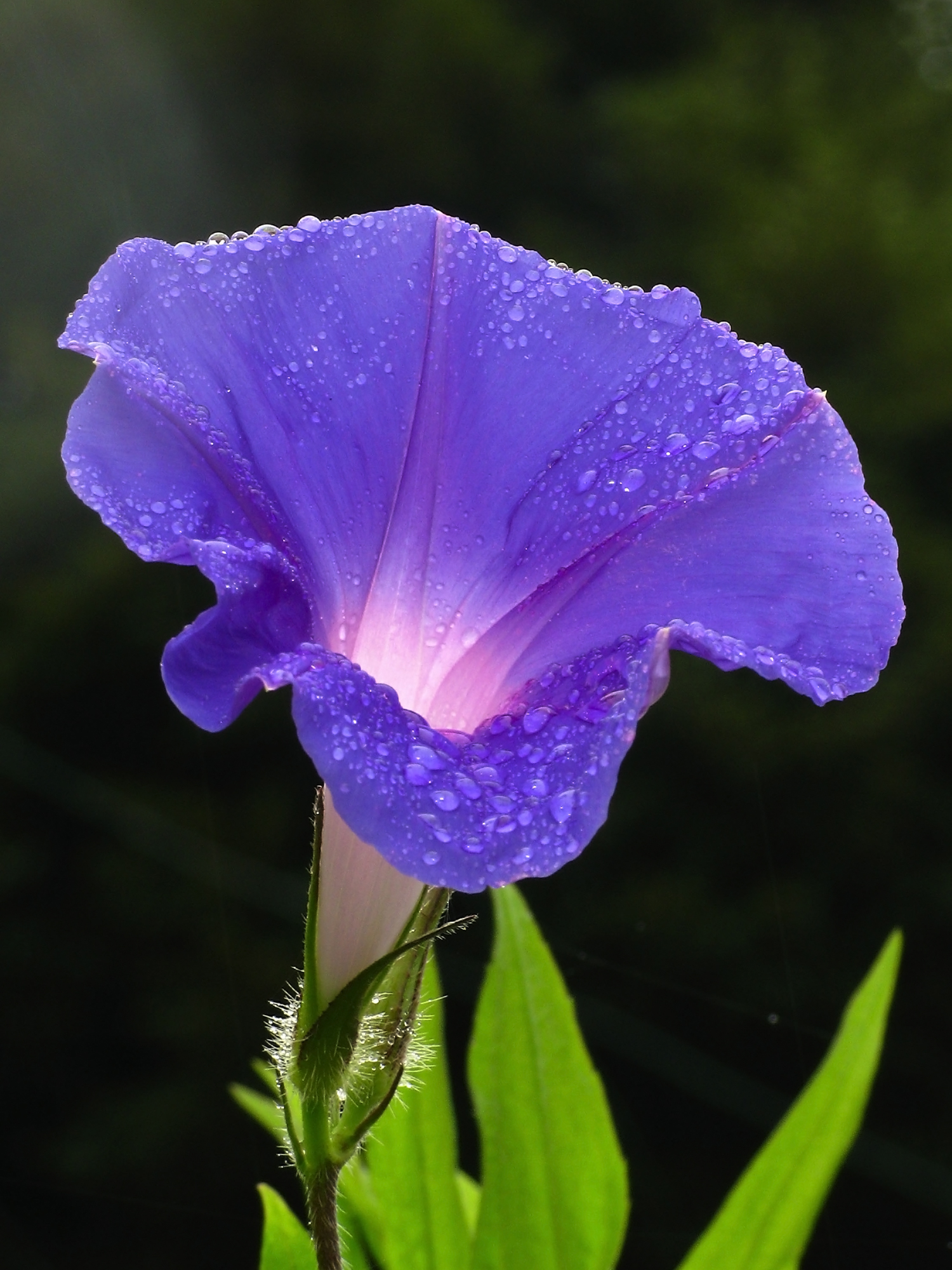
Morning glory flower, Ipomoea nil

Ipomoea nil, a species of morning glory, was first known in China for its medicinal uses, due to the laxative properties of its seeds.

Ancient Mesoamerican civilizations used the morning glory species Ipomoea alba to convert the latex from the Castilla elastica tree and also the guayule plant to produce bouncing rubber balls. The sulfur in the morning glory's juice served to vulcanize the rubber, a process antedating Charles Goodyear's discovery by at least 3,000 years. Aztec priests in Mexico were also known to use the plant's hallucinogenic properties (see Rivea corymbosa).

== Cultivation ==
In cultivation, most are treated as perennial plants in frost-free areas and as annual plants in colder climates, but some species tolerate winter cold. Some species are strictly annual (e.g. Ipomoea nil), producing many seeds, and some perennial species (e.g. I. indica) are propagated by cuttings. Some moonflowers, which flower at night, are also in the morning glory family.

=== Crop ===
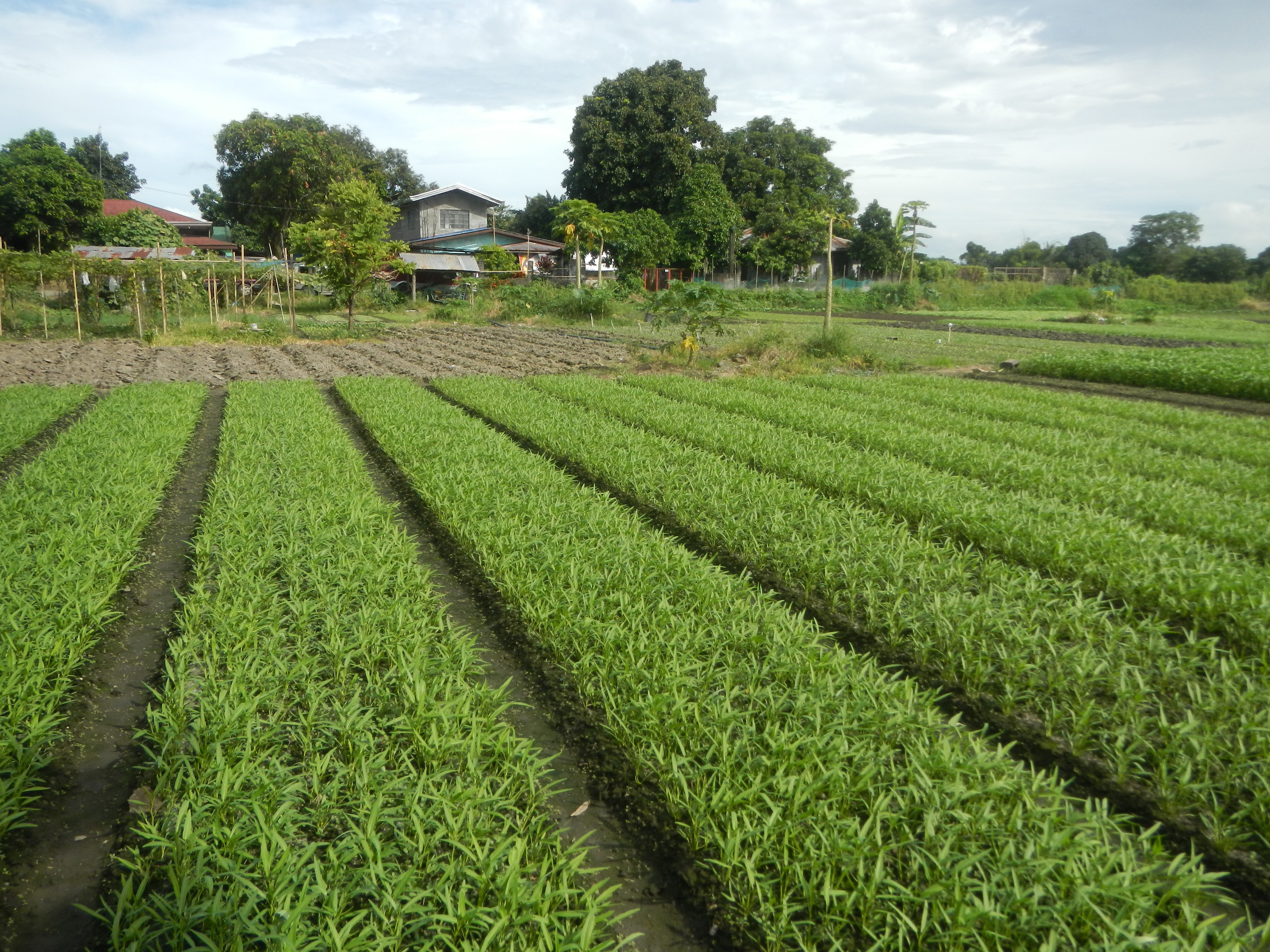
Cultivated Ipomoea aquatica in Bulacan, Philippines

Ipomoea aquatica is most commonly grown in east, south, and southeast Asia. It flourishes naturally in waterways, and requires little if any care. It is used extensively in Indonesian, Burmese, Thai, Lao, Cambodian, Malay, Vietnamese, Filipino, and Chinese cuisine, especially in rural or kampung (village) areas. The vegetable is also extremely popular in Taiwan, where it grows well. During the Japanese occupation of Singapore in World War II, the vegetable grew remarkably easily in many areas, and became a popular wartime crop.

=== Invasive species ===
In some places, such as Australian bushland, some species of morning glories develop thick roots and tend to grow in dense thickets. They can quickly spread by way of long, creeping stems. By crowding out, blanketing, and smothering other plants, morning glory has turned into a serious invasive weed problem.

In parts of the US, species such as Convolvulus sepium (hedge bindweed), Ipomoea purpurea (common morning glory) and Ipomoea indica (blue morning glory) have shown to be invasive.

==== Legal status ====
===== United States =====
As of 2021, most non-native species of Ipomoea are currently illegal to cultivate, possess, and sell in the U.S. state of Arizona, and before 4 January 2020, this ban applied to native species, too. This is because some species of Convolvulaceae (like Convolvulus arvensis and Ipomoea × leucantha) have been known to cause problems in crops, especially in cotton fields.

Ipomoea aquatica is a federal noxious weed. Though some states do not adhere to this regulation; it can be illegal to grow, import, possess, or sell without a permit. However, Texas has acknowledged its status as a vegetable and allows it to be grown.

== Uses ==
=== Plants ===
==== Culinary ====
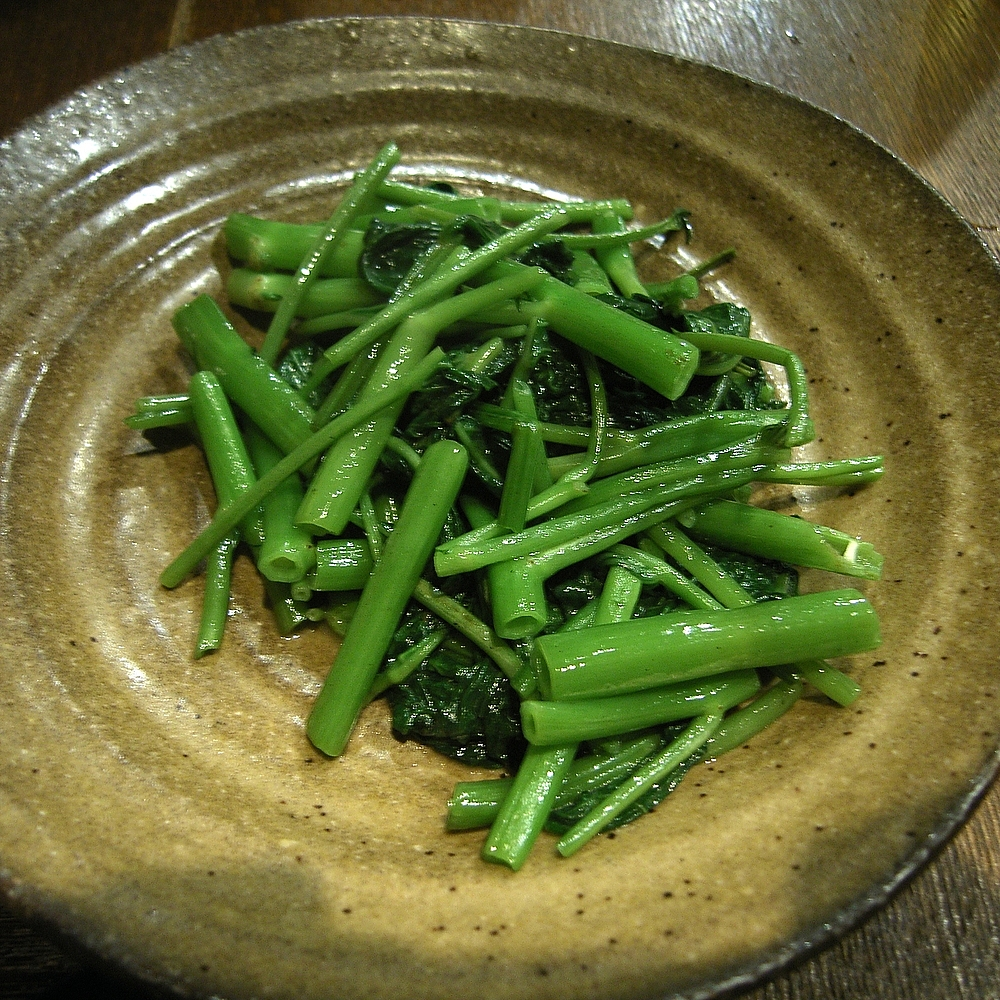
Ipomoea aquatica cooked

Ipomoea aquatica, known as water spinach, water morning glory, water convolvulus, ong-choy, kangkung, or swamp cabbage, is popularly used as a leaf vegetable, especially in East and Southeast Asian cuisines. As of 2005, the state of Texas has acknowledged that water spinach is a highly prized vegetable in many cultures, and has allowed it to be grown for personal consumption, in part because it is known to have been grown in Texas for more than 15 years and has not yet escaped cultivation.

The genus Ipomoea also contains the sweet potato (I. batatas). Though the term "morning glory" is not usually extended to I. batatas, sometimes it may be referred to as a "tuberous morning glory" in a horticultural context.

==== Green building ====
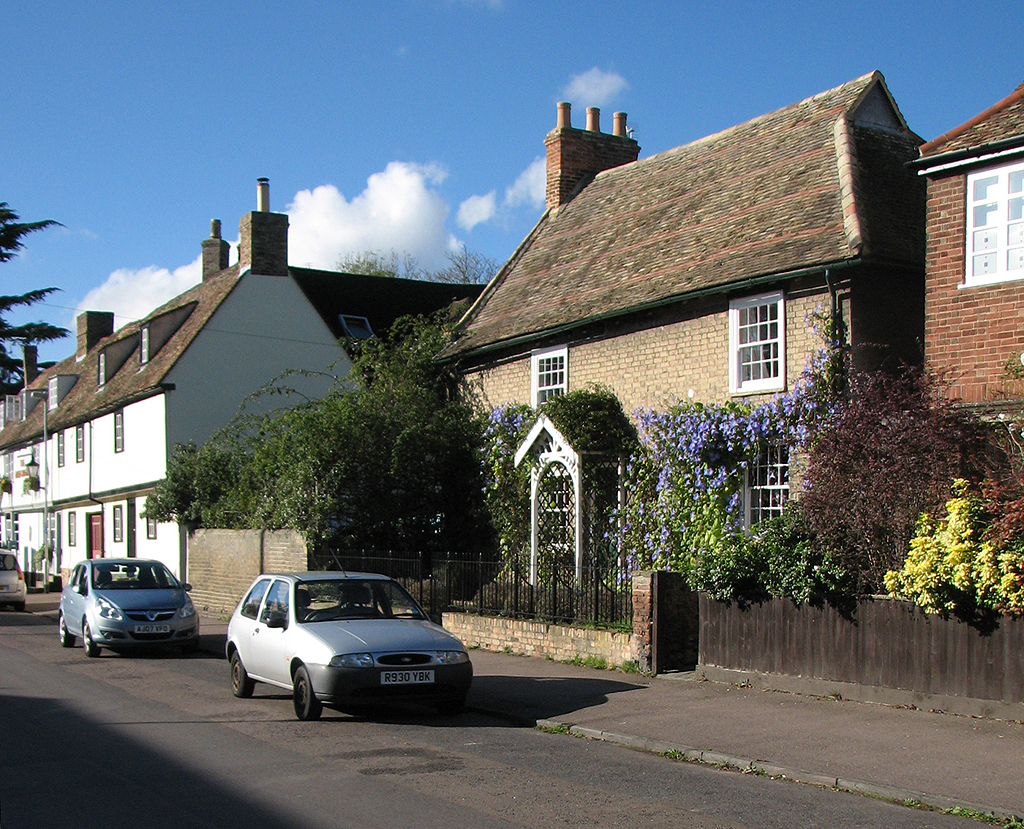
Morning glory in Water Street

Because of their fast growth, twining habit, attractive flowers, and tolerance for poor, dry soils, some morning glories are excellent vines for creating summer shade on building walls when trellised, thus providing passive cooling—a common strategy in green building.

==== Ornamental plants ====
Popular varieties in contemporary Western cultivation include 'Sunspots', 'Heavenly Blue', moonflower, cypress vine, and cardinal climber. Cardinal climber is a hybrid, with cypress vine as one parent.

Many morning glories self-seed in the garden. They have a hard seed coat, which delays germination until late spring. Germination may be improved by soaking in warm water.

Morning glory has been a favorite flower in Japan for many a long century. The cultivation started in the Nara period (8th century). The big booms of the selective breeding of the morning glory happened in the Edo era (17-19th century). The large-flowered morning glory was broadly cultivated as a hobby flower. The varied Japanese morning glory (変化朝顔 Henka-asagao or mutant morning glory) was created.

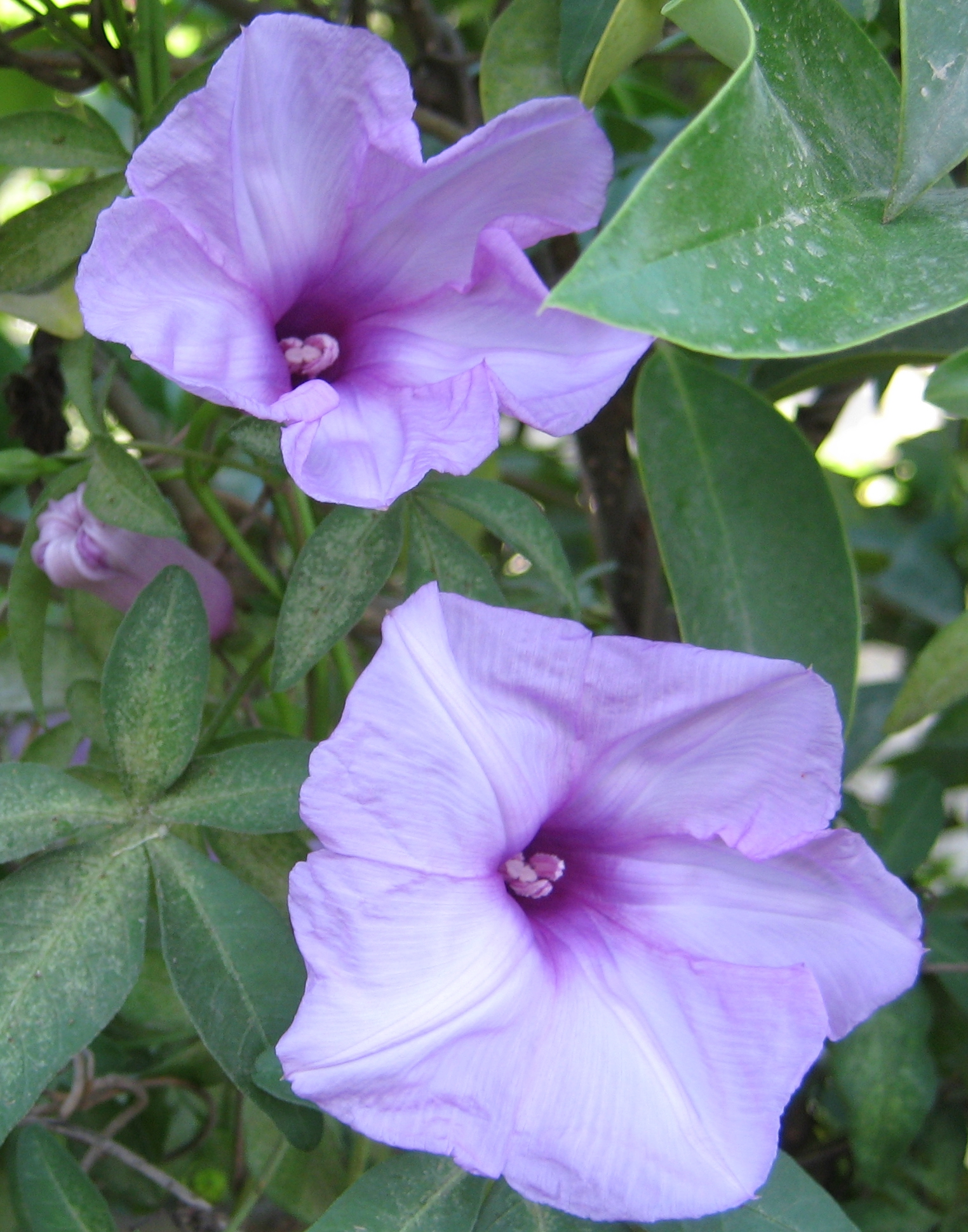
Cairo morning glory (Ipomoea cairica)

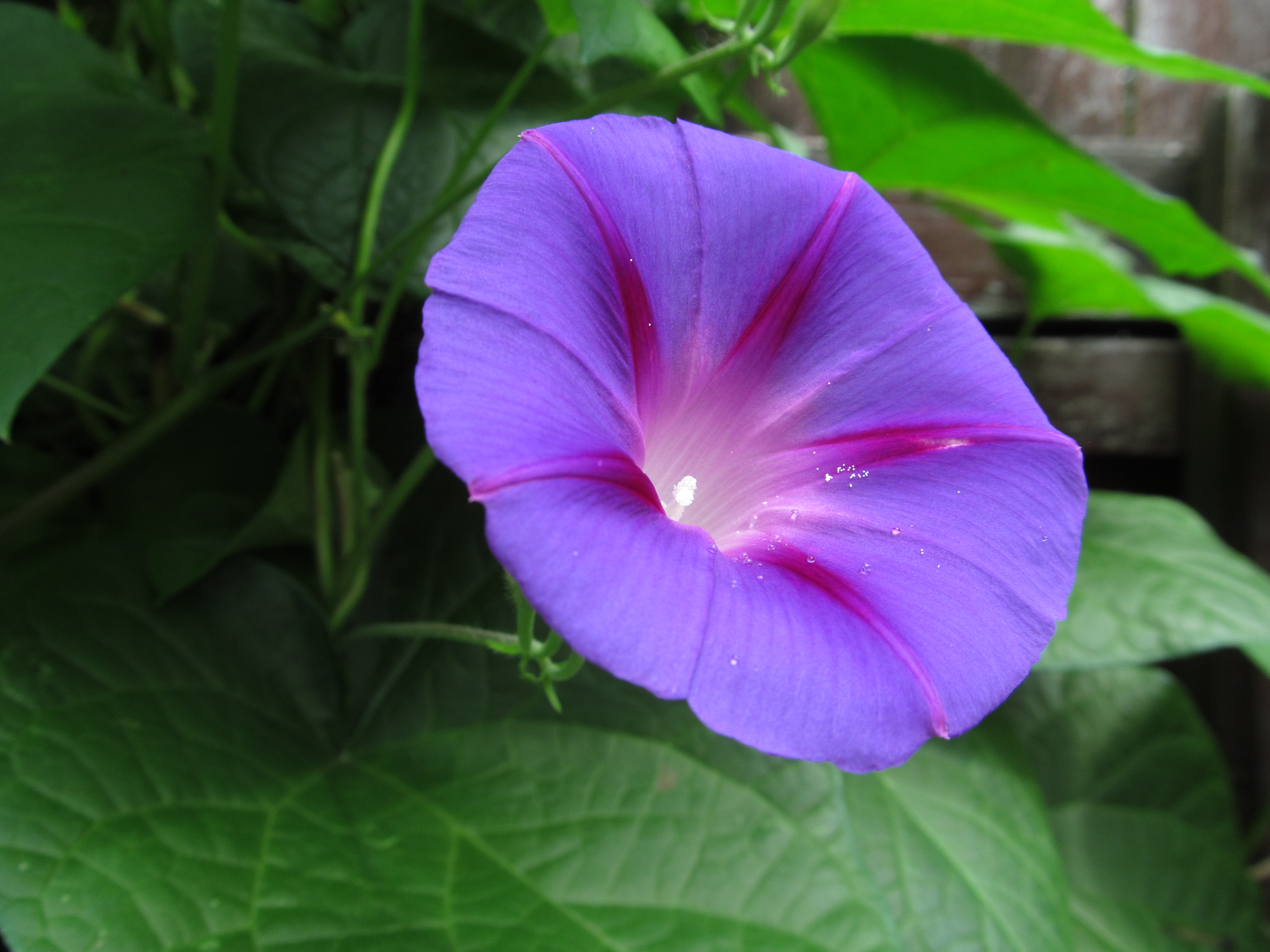
Opening purple morning glory (Ipomoea purpurea)

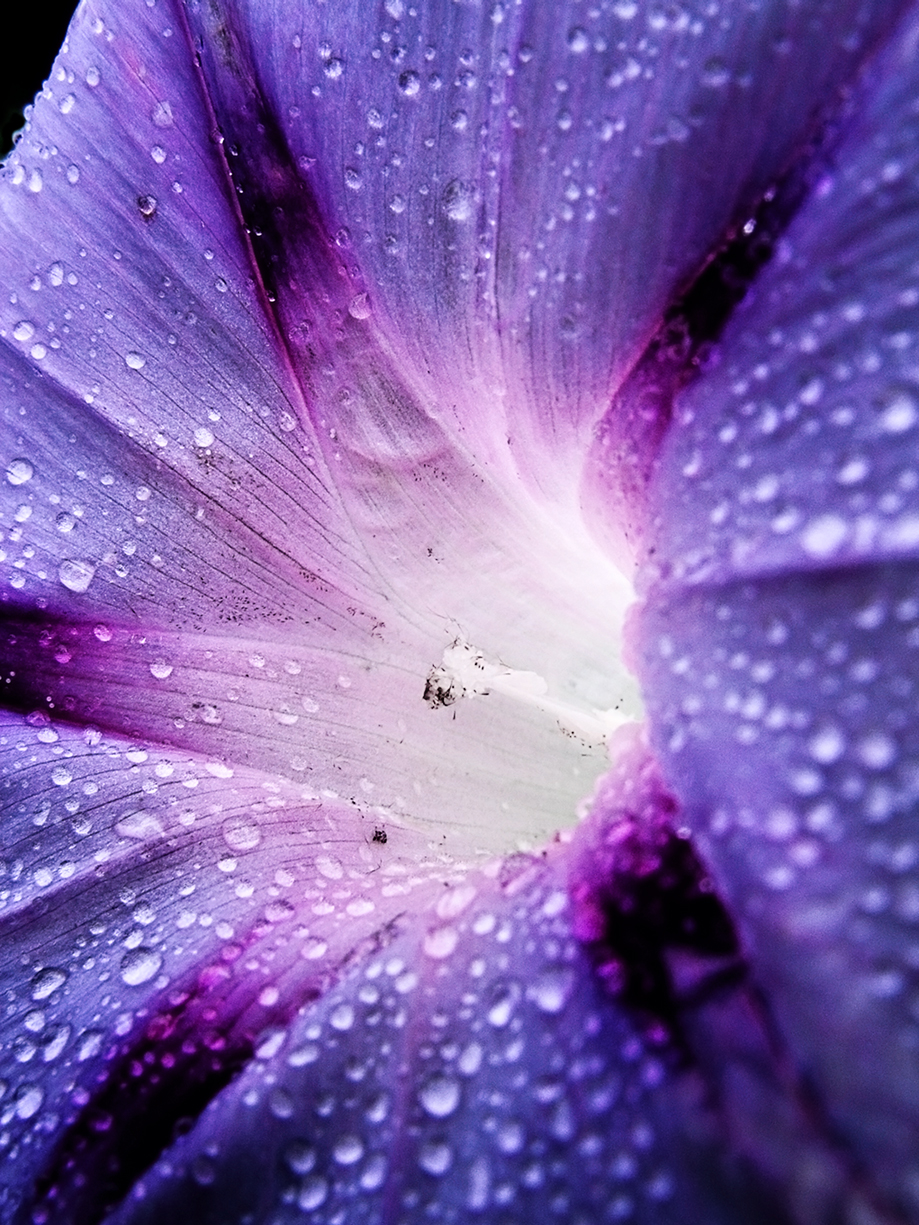
Close-up of a blue morning glory flower (Ipomoea indica)

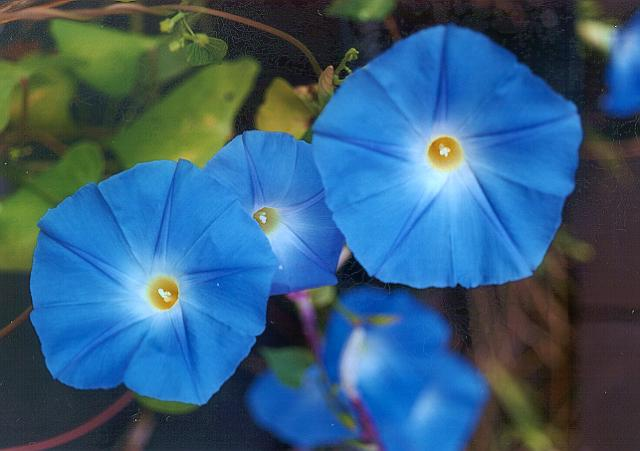
Mexican morning glory (Ipomoea tricolor)

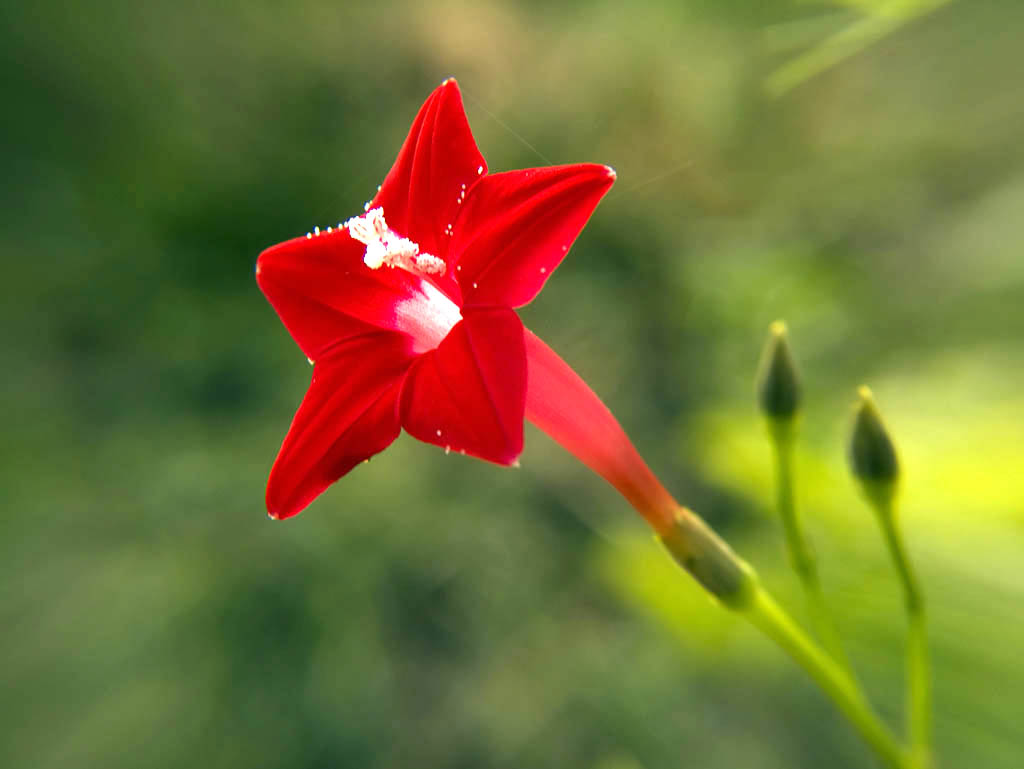
Cypress vine flower (Ipomoea quamoclit)
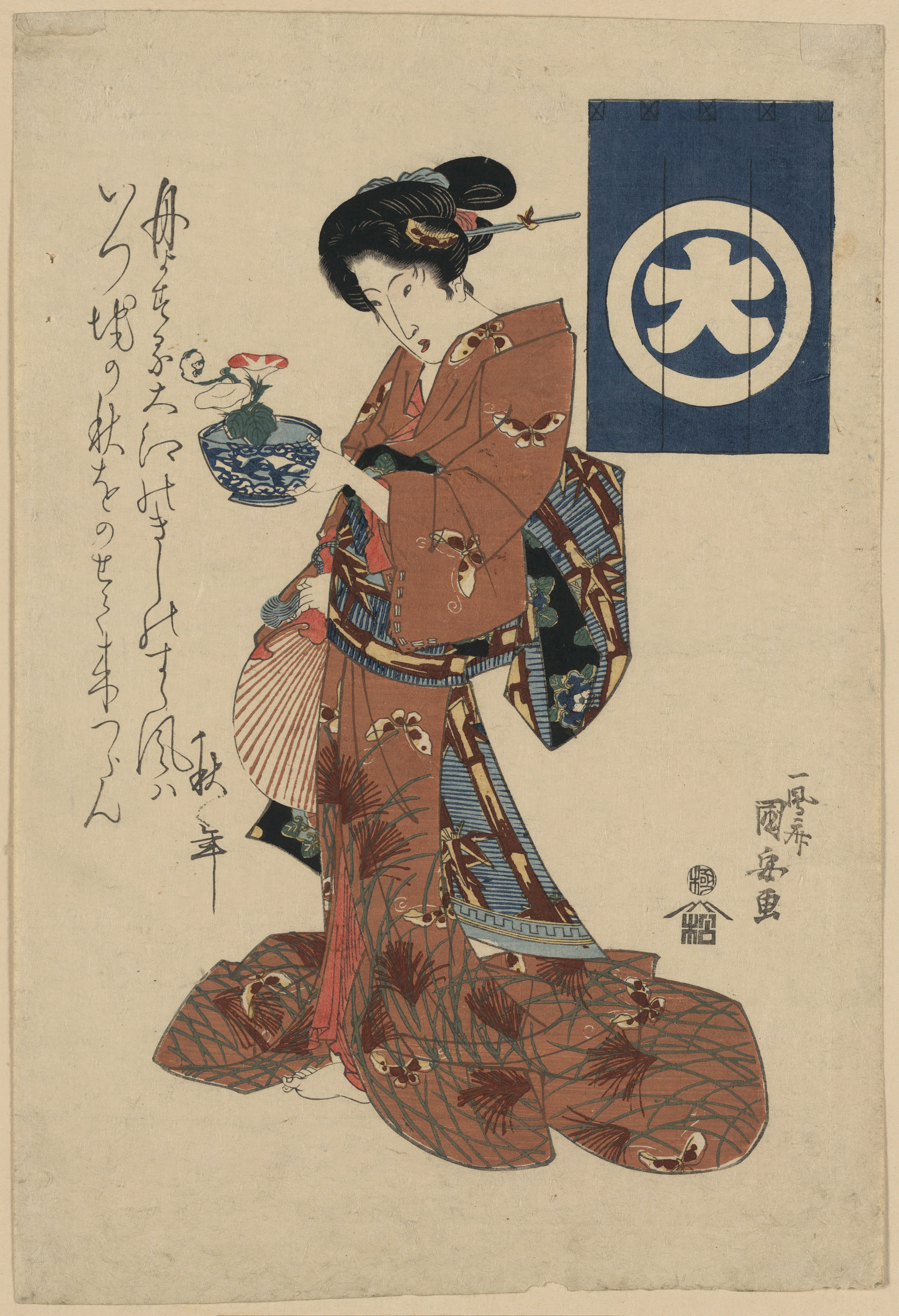

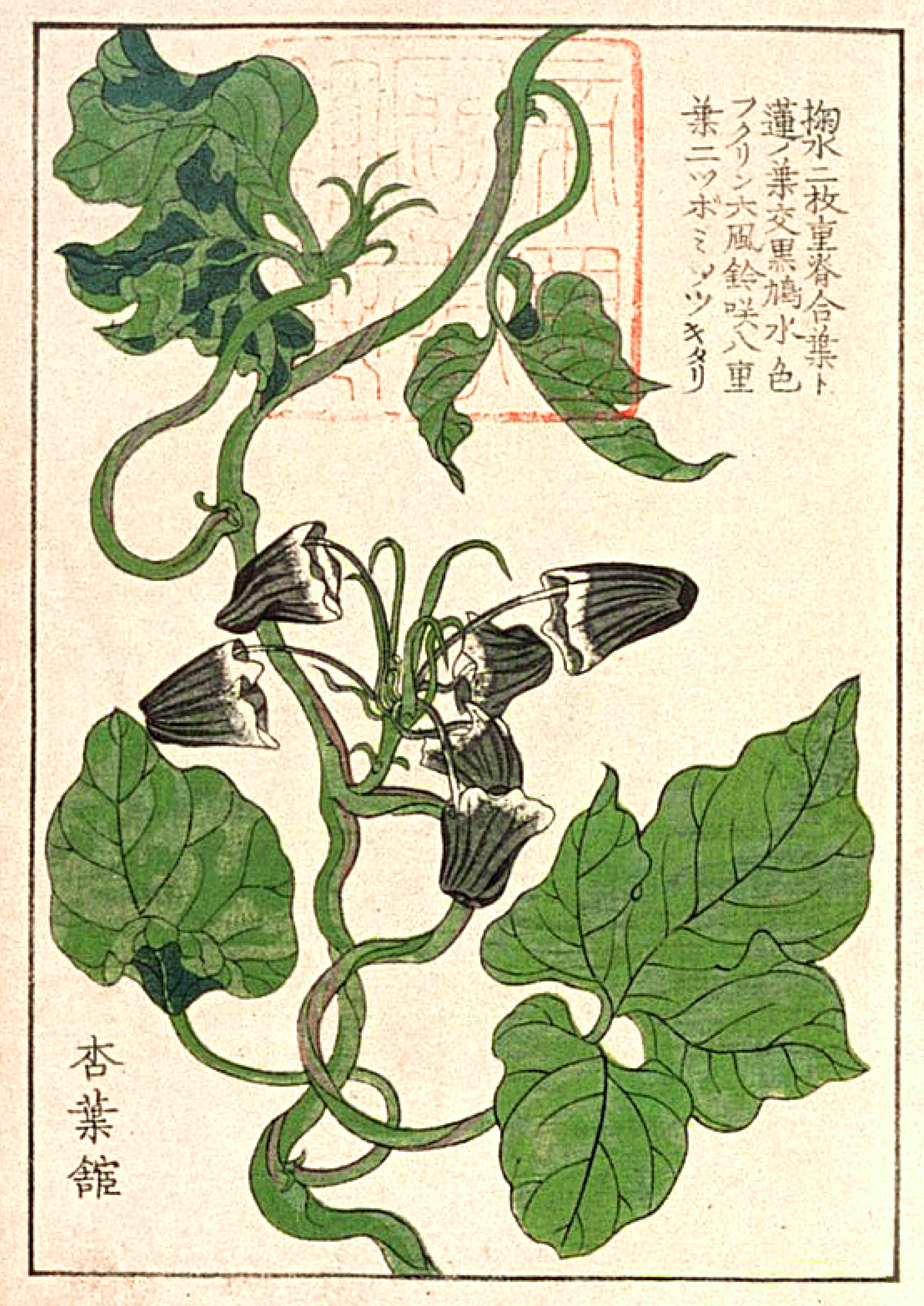

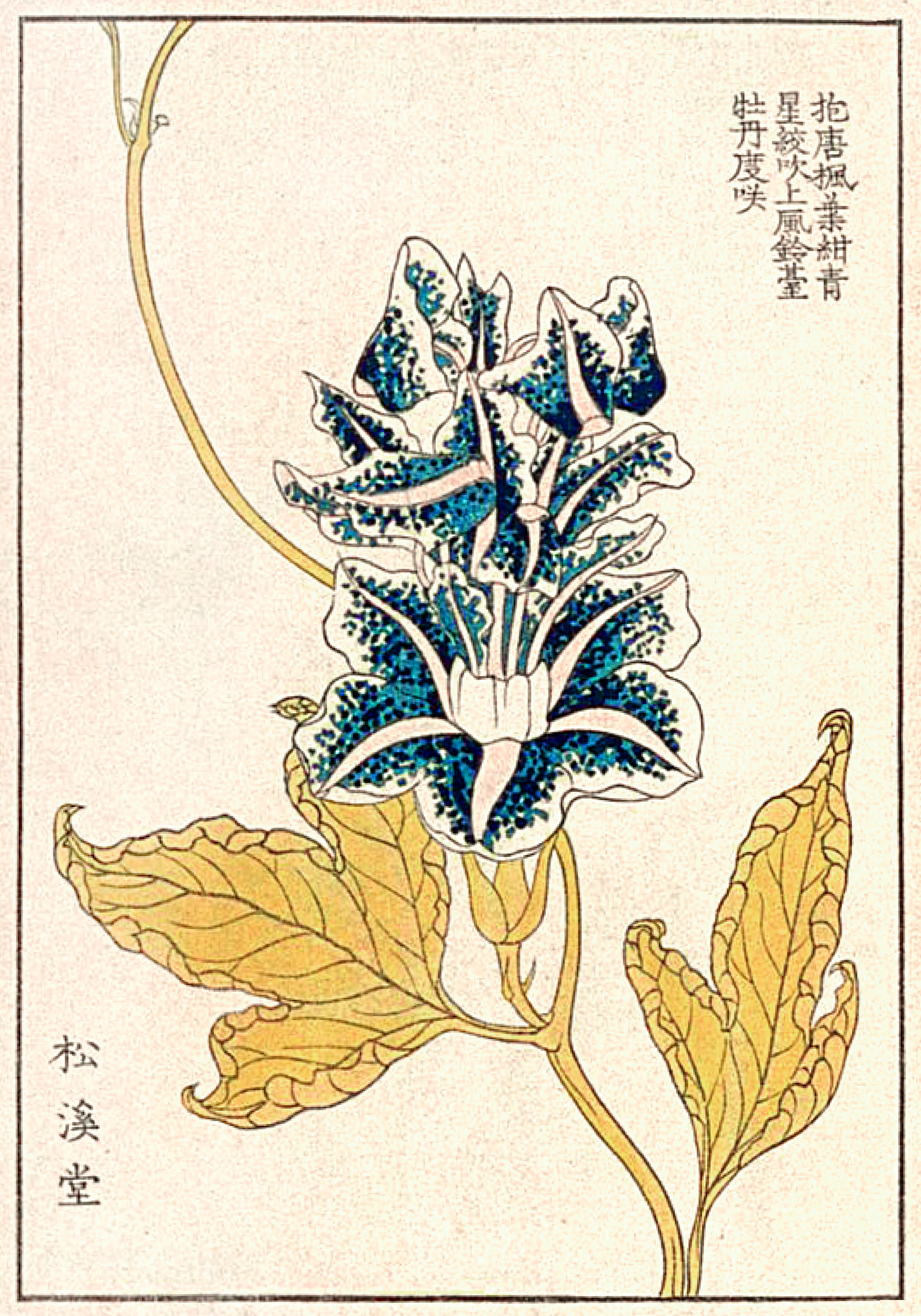

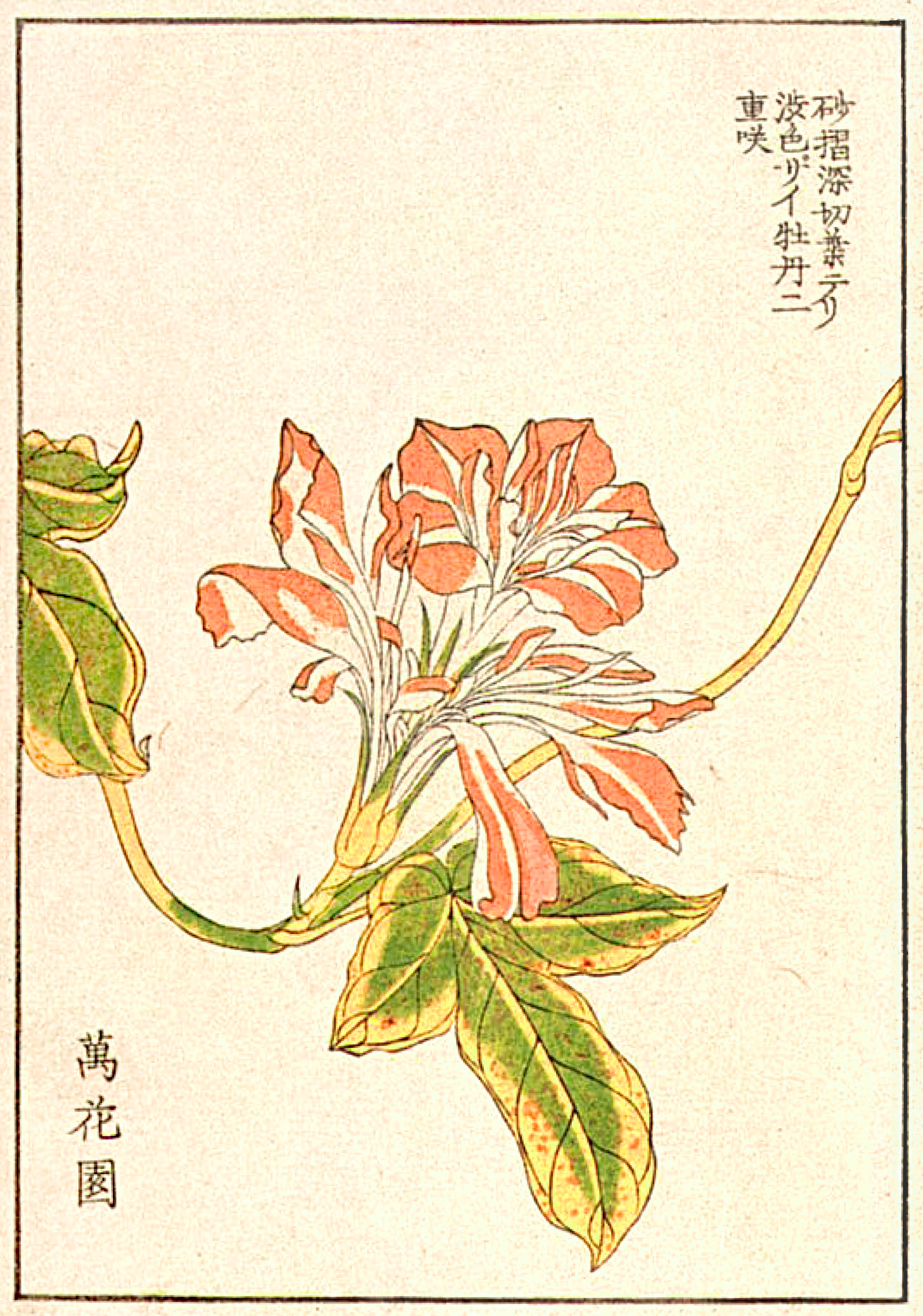

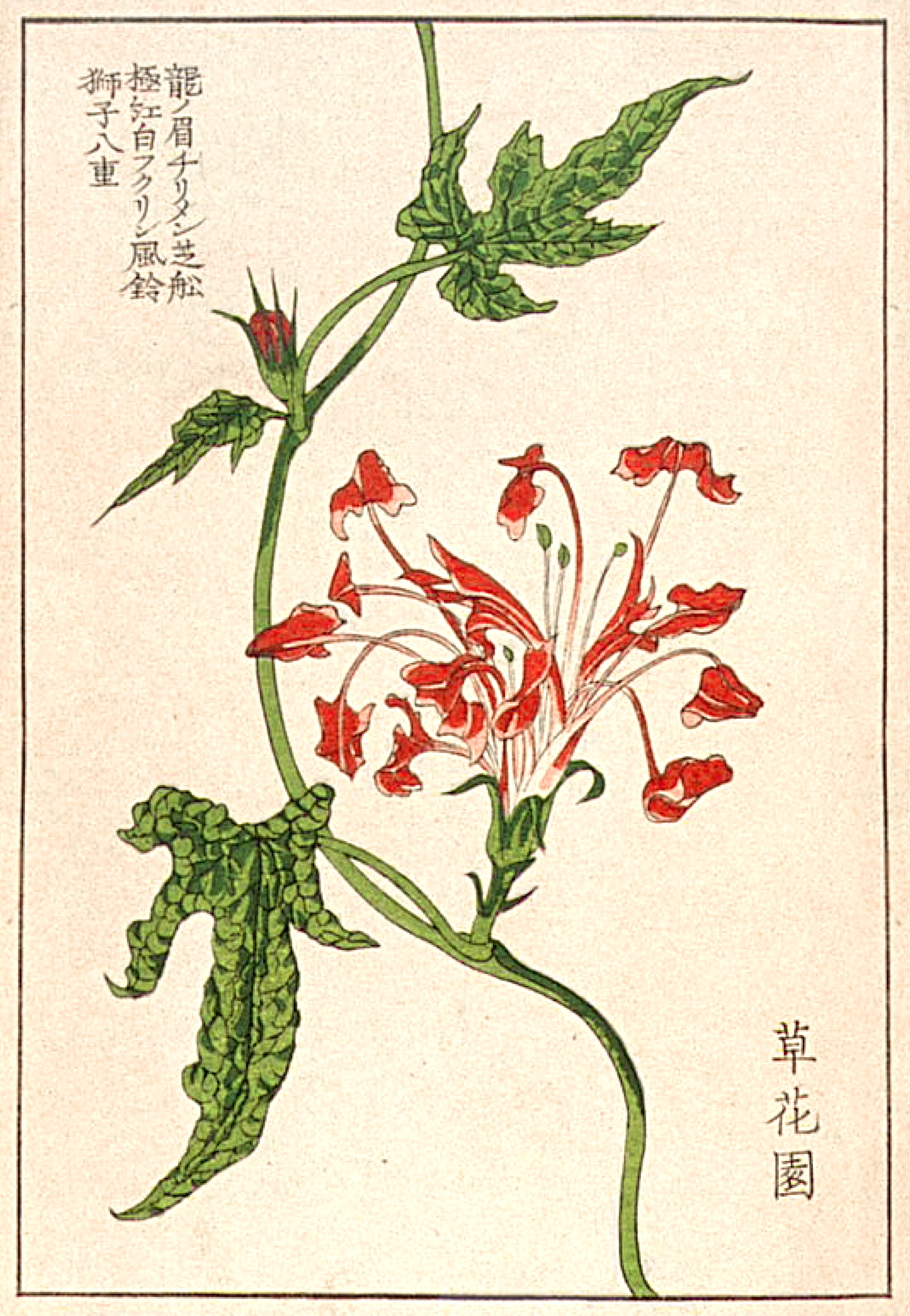

=== Seeds ===
==== Psychoactive use ====
Stereo image
Left frame
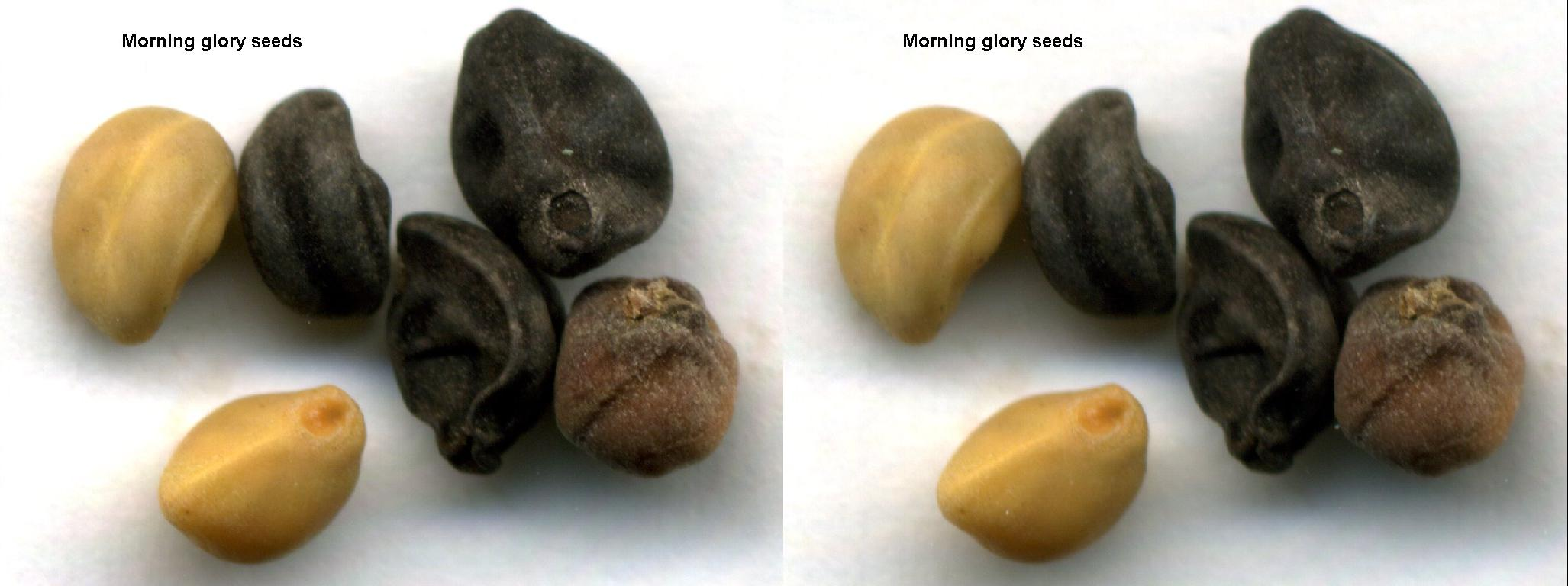
Right frame
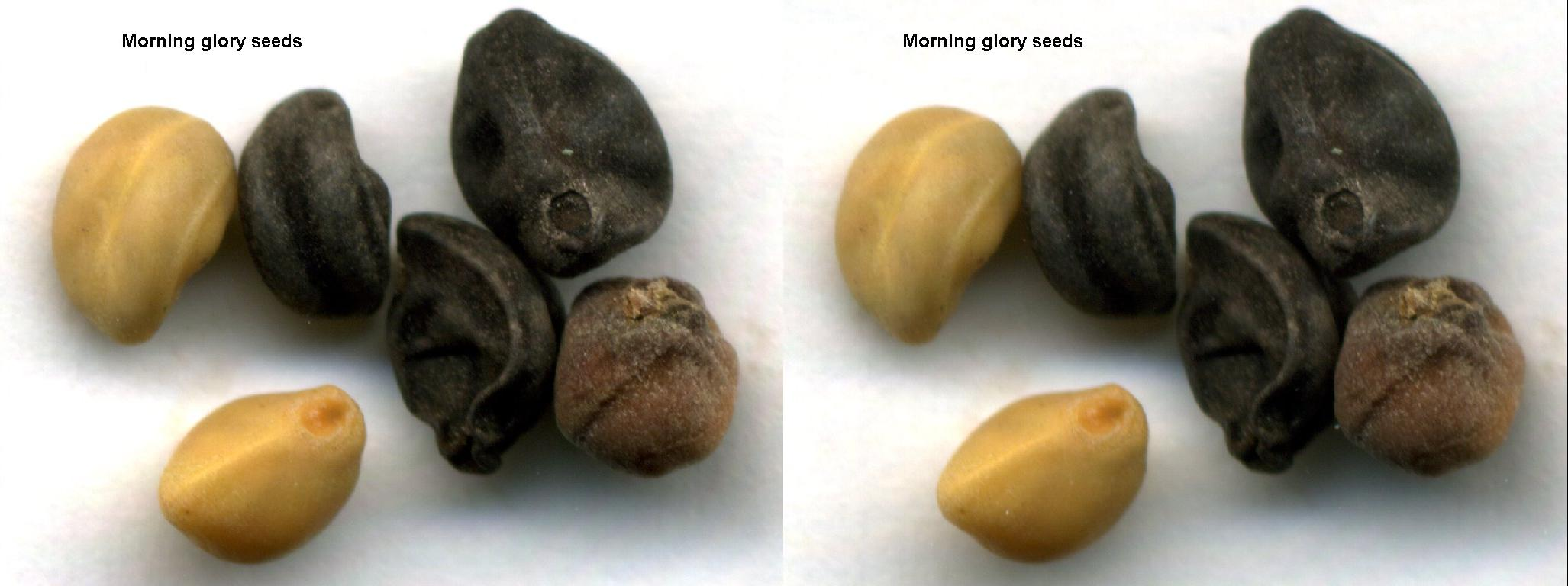
Parallel view
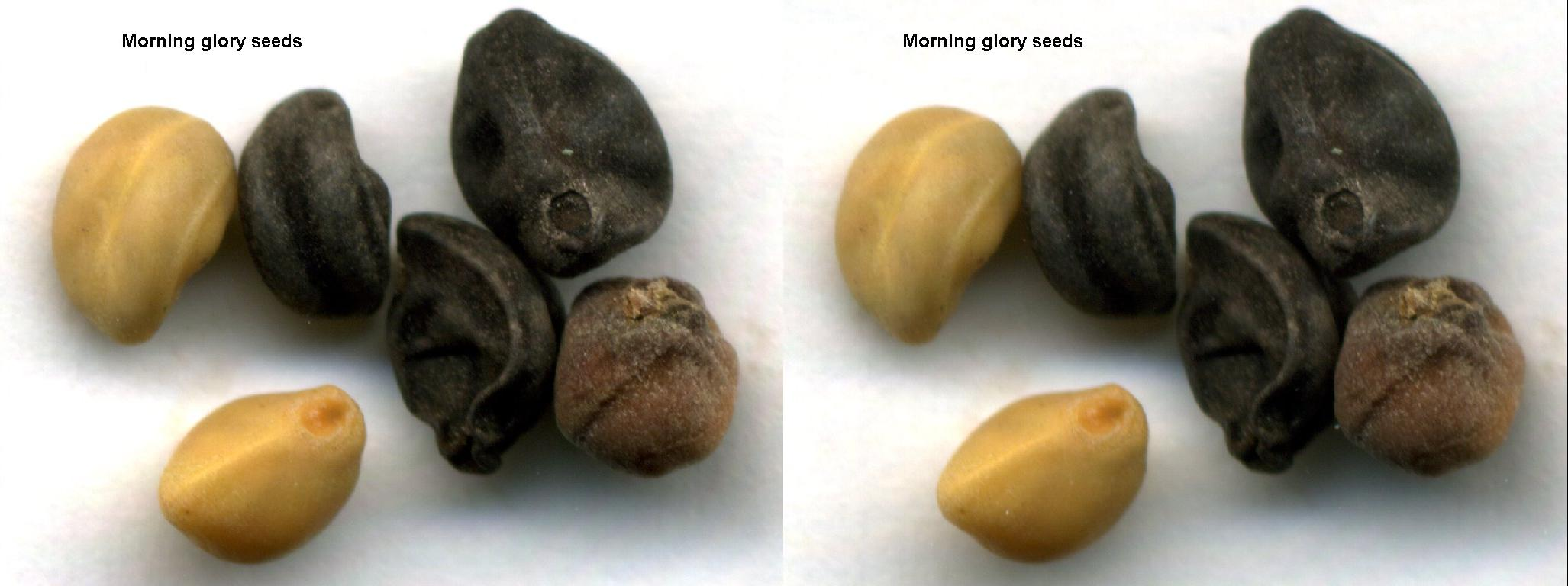
Cross-eye view
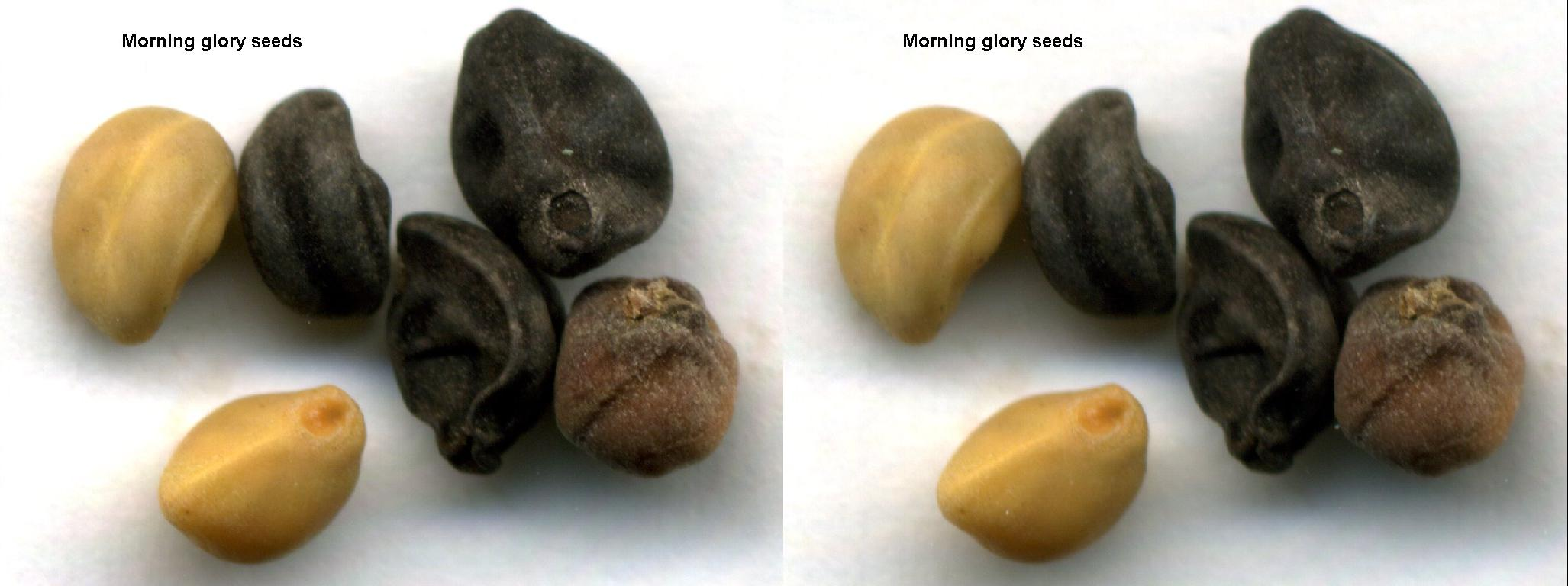

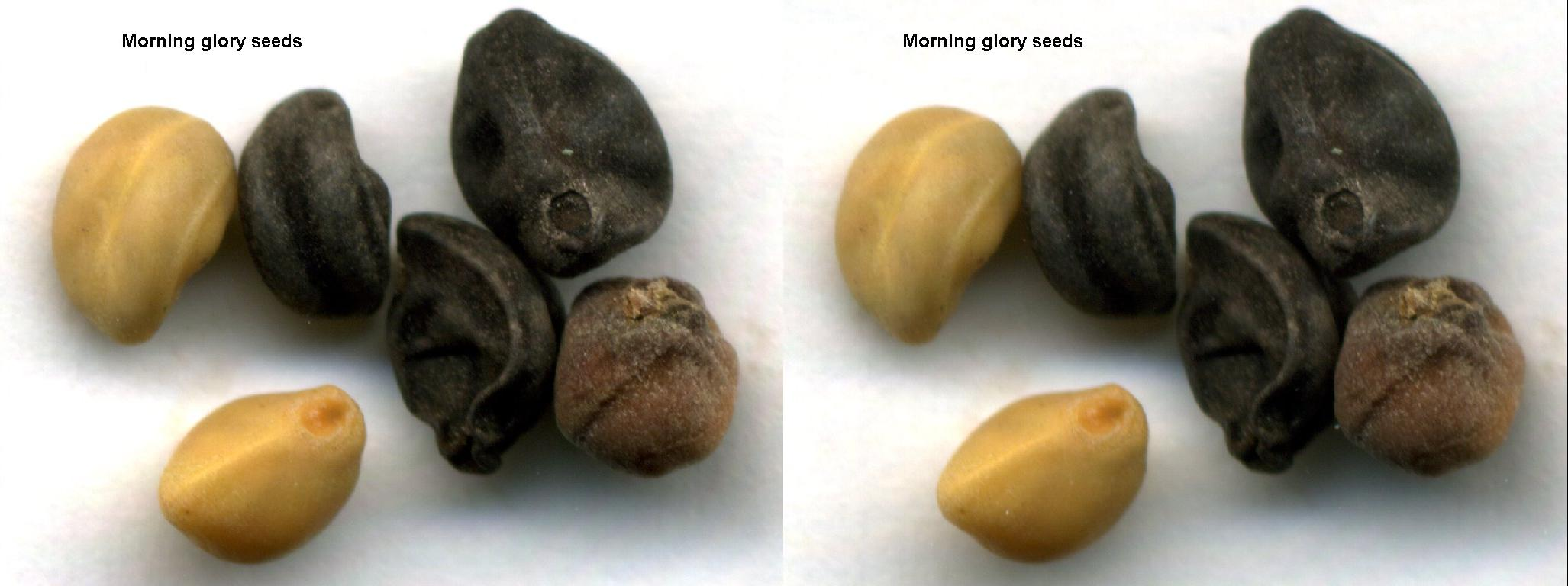
- Morning glory seeds, mixed colors

Seeds of Argyreia nervosa (Hawaiian baby woodrose), Ipomoea tricolor and Ipomoea corymbosa (syn. R. corymbosa) are used as psychedelics. In addition, many other species have been identified to contain ergoline alkaloids.

Seeds of morning glory species (Ipomoea spp.) can produce psychoactive effects similar to LSD when consumed in large quantities (often hundreds of seeds). However, Hawaiian baby woodrose seeds (Argyreia nervosa), a closely related species, are significantly more potent, typically requiring only 5–10 seeds. For optimal effects, seeds from any species should ideally be ground—rather than merely chewed—as swallowing the seeds whole results in little to no psychoactive effect. This is because the ergoline alkaloids, such as ergine (LSA), are present not only in the outer layers but also within the kernel, and proper preparation is necessary to make these compounds bioavailable.

The onset is 20 to 180 minutes and the duration is 4 to 10 hours.

Psychoactive morning glory seeds
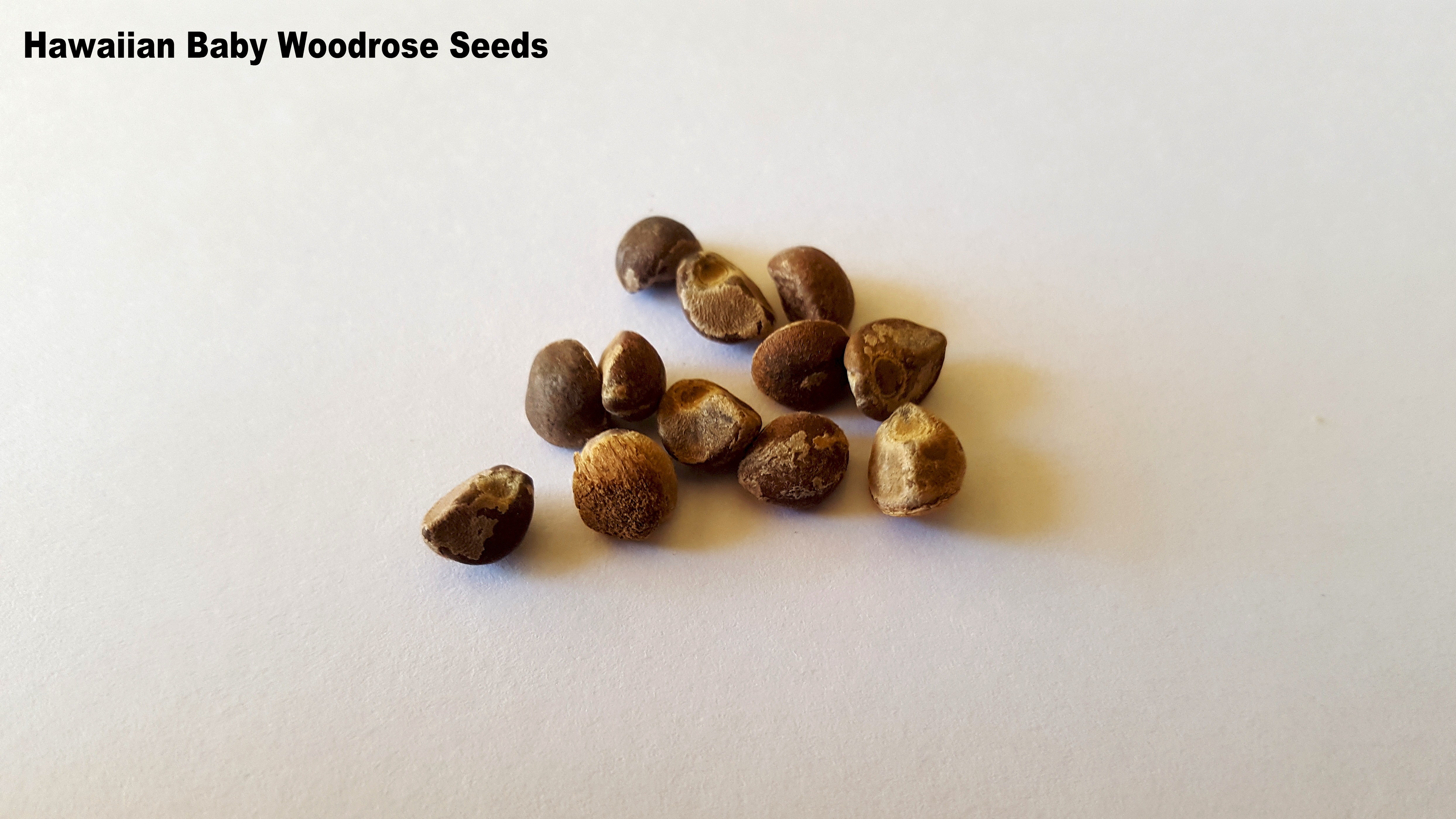
Argyreia nervosa (Hawaiian baby woodrose (HBW))

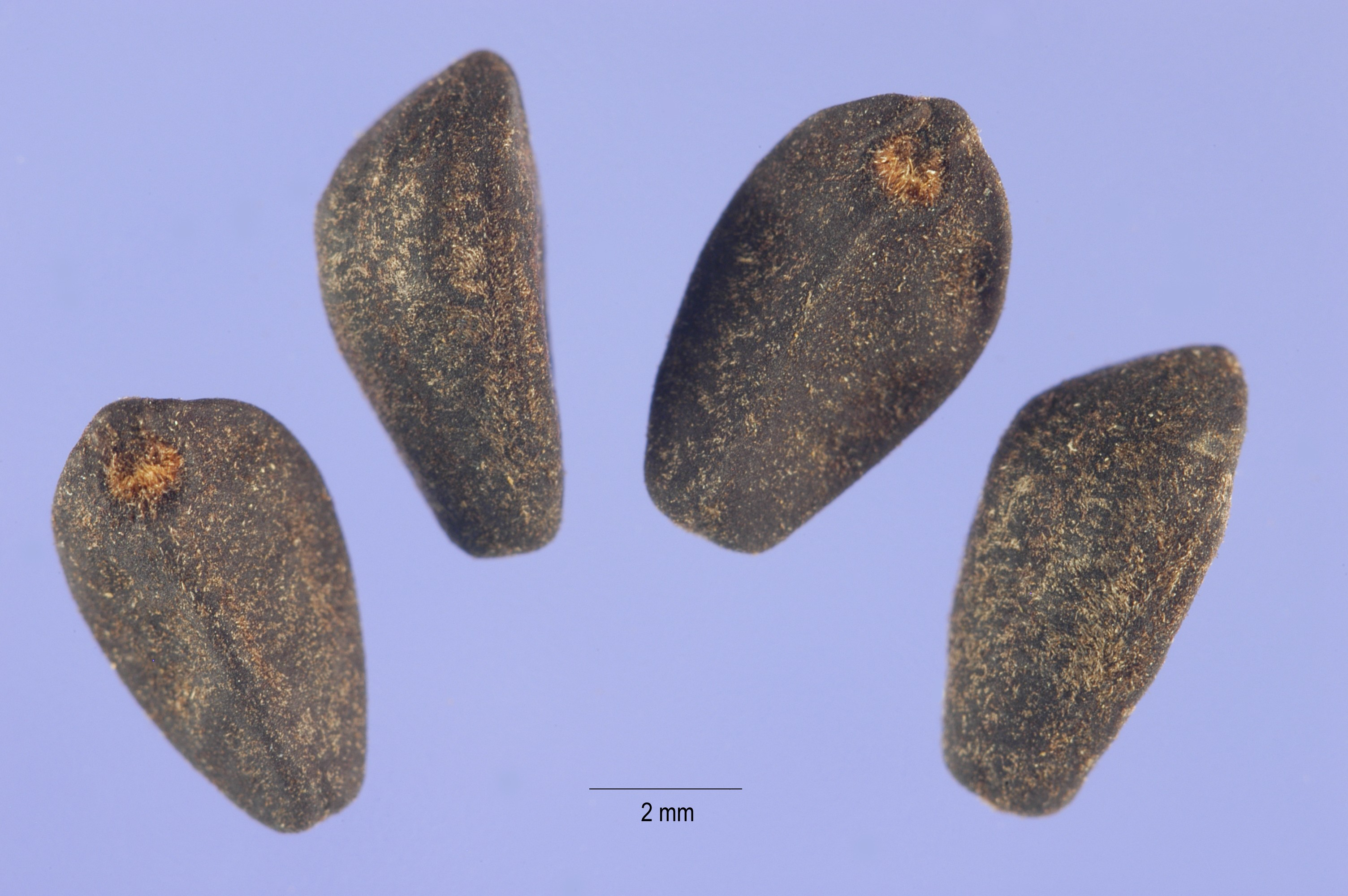
Ipomoea tricolor (Mexican morning glory)

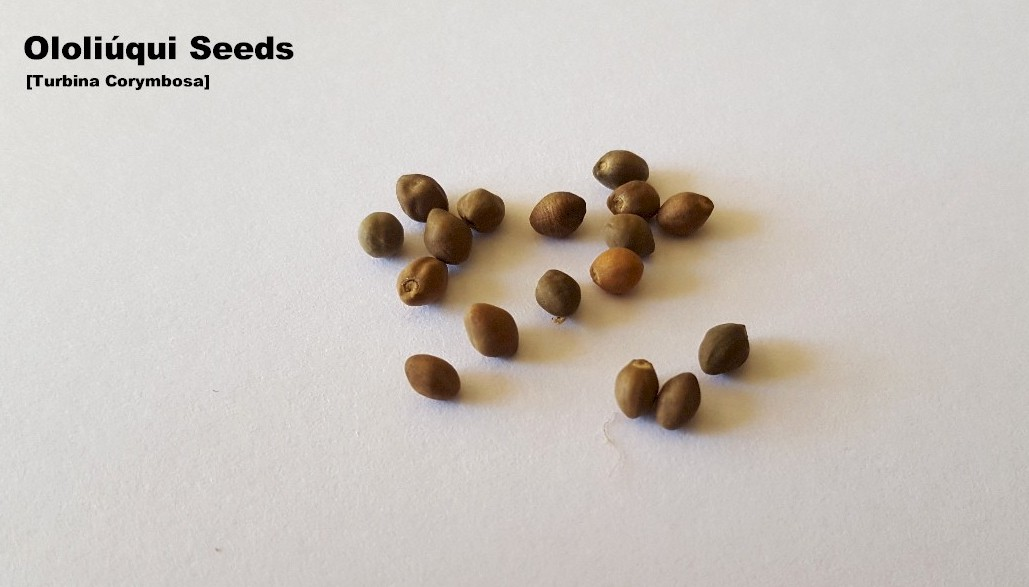
Ipomoea corymbosa (Rivea corymbosa)

===== Chemical properties =====
The seeds of many species of morning glory contain ergoline alkaloids such as the psychoactive and/or psychedelic lysergamides ergine (lysergic acid amide; LSA) and isoergine (isolysergic acid amide; iso-LSA), which are closely structurally related to lysergic acid diethylamide (LSD).

Though the chemicals ergine and isoergine are not legal in some countries, the seeds are found in many gardening stores; however, some claim the seeds from commercial sources can sometimes be coated in some kind of pesticide or methylmercury (although the latter is illegal in the UK and the US).

Previously thought to be exclusively synthetic compounds, methylergometrine and methysergide have also been reported to occur in Argyreia nervosa (common name Hawaiian baby woodrose (HBW)).

According to Alexander Shulgin in his 1997 book TiHKAL (Tryptamines I Have Known and Loved), both ergine and isoergine are "probably correctly dismissed" as not contributing to the effects of morning glory seeds. The poorly-stable lysergic acid hydroxyethylamides (LSHs) might alternatively be involved in the psychedelic effects of morning glory seeds per Shulgin.

===== List of psychoactive species =====
Periglandula fungi, known to produce psychoactive ergoline alkaloids such as ergine (lysergic acid amide), live symbiotically with the seeds of several morning glory species, including:

- Argyreia nervosa
- I. adenioides
- I. amnicola
- I. aquatica
- I. argillicola
- I. asarifolia
- I. batatoides
- I. cicatricosa
- I corymbosa
- I. gracilis
- I. graminea
- I. hildebrandtii
- I. killipiana
- I. kituiensis
- I. leptophylla
- I. mauritiana
- I. muelleri
- I. pes-caprae
- I. racemosa
- I. tricolor
- I. urbaniana
- Stictocardia spp.

Many of these species have not been well studied for their psychoactive effects in humans, and the presence of psychoactive alkaloids does not necessarily mean that all listed species have a history of traditional use or documented psychoactive activity in people.

Consuming the seeds of I. aquatica may produce psychoactive effects due to the presence of ergoline alkaloids. However, the plant is most widely used as a culinary vegetable, with its leaves and stems eaten as food rather than its seeds. It does not have psychoactive effects when consumed as a vegetable.
