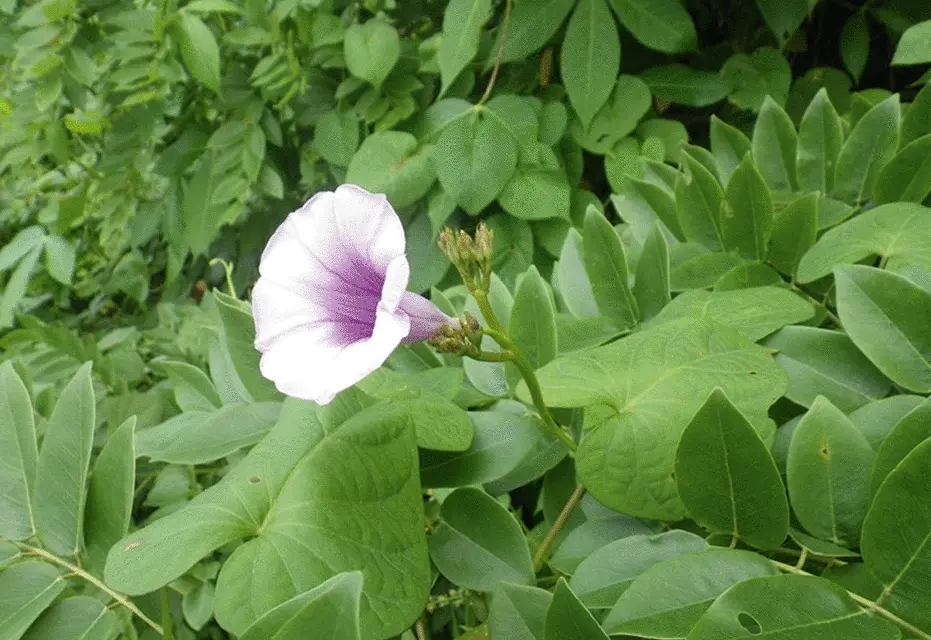

Scientific classification
- Kingdom: Plantae
- Clade: Embryophytes
- Clade: Tracheophytes
- Clade: Angiosperms
- Clade: Eudicots
- Clade: Asterids
- Order: Solanales
- Family: Convolvulaceae
- Genus: Ipomoea
- Species: I. aequatoriensis

Binomial name
- Ipomoea aequatoriensis T.Wells & P.Muñoz

= Ipomoea aequatoriensis =

Species of flowering plant

Ipomoea aequatoriensis is a morning glory plant which was first scientifically described in 2022, and is the closest wild relative to the sweet potato known to science. The evolution of the sweet potato has always been a mystery, however with the discovery of this new plant, the history has become a bit clearer. The newly found plant was discovered by an Oxford University team of researchers led by Dr. Pablo Muńoz-Rodríguez. The plant was "stumbled upon" when the team was looking at herbarium specimens that had been collected of the plant Ipomoea batatas when researchers realized that one of the collected specimens differed in sepals and other characteristics.

== Description ==
The newly found specimen of I. aequatoriensis is the closest wild relative of the sweet potato yet discovered, according to research published in 2022 by researchers from Oxford University's Plant Sciences department. The plant is a morning glory that is weedy with flowers that are white and purple in color. Before discovery of I. aequatoriensis, the plant I. batatas were known to be the most closely related to the sweet potato. However, I. aequatoriensis differ because they are tetraploid meaning they have four sets of chromosomes. This puts them the closest to the sweetpotato since they are hexaploidy with six sets of chromosomes. In addition, the sepals of the new plant are said to be obovate meaning that they have a narrower end at the base of the flower. I. aequatoriensis has been discovered to be found only in a single geographic area. As for morphology, they are closely related to I. batatas, in the fact that they have similar corolla size and dense subumbellate inflorescence. But, they differ due to the sepals being shorter and the stems being thinner with longer internodes.

== Habitat ==
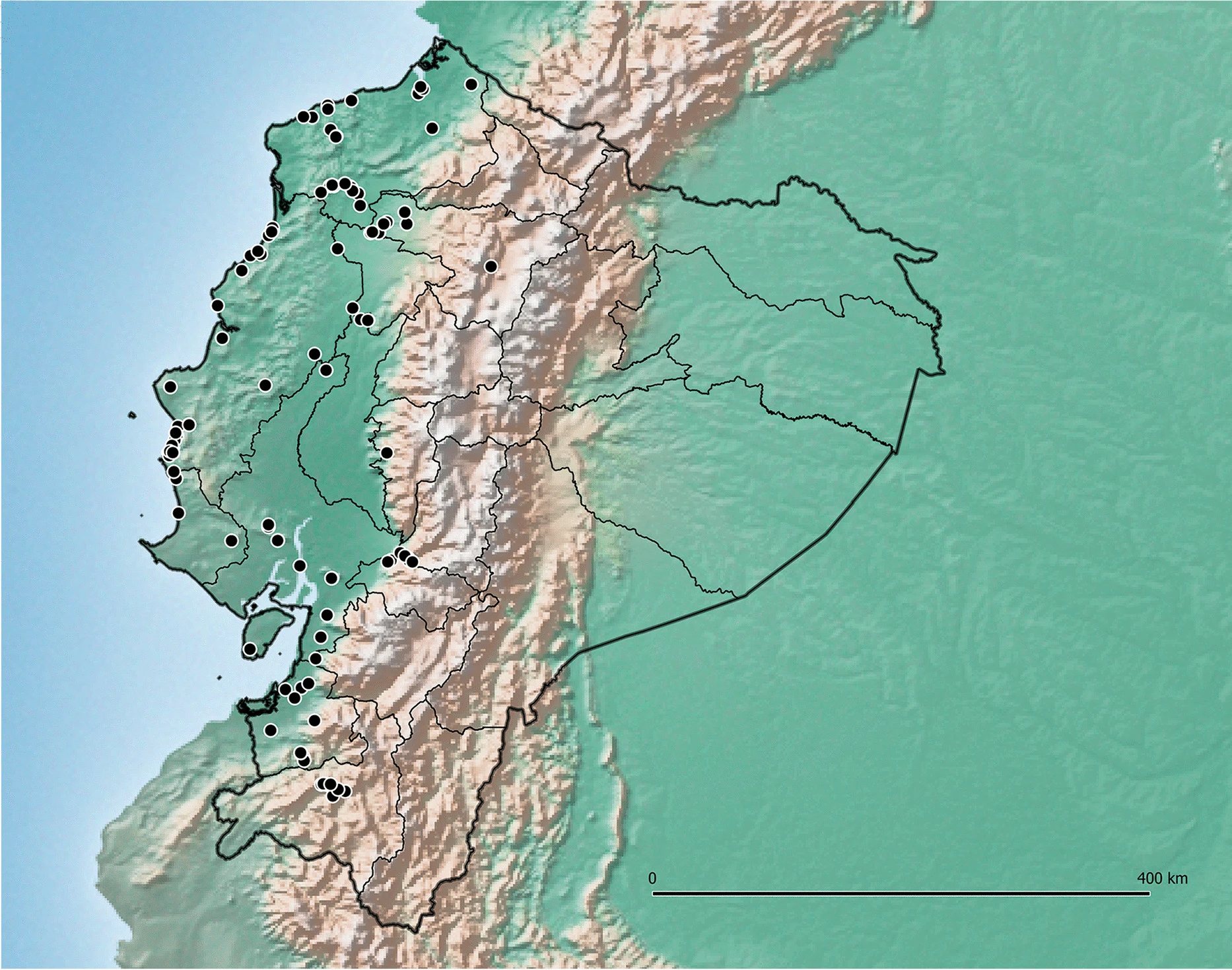
Distribution of I. aequatoriensis.

Ipomoea aequatoriensis can be found in the coastal areas of South America in Ecuador.

== Conservation ==
Ipomoea aequatoriensis is currently not on any endangerment lists. Conservation efforts for the newly found have not been named. However, with the recent discovery that this plant is the most closely wild relative of the sweet potato, efforts for more in depth genomic research have been fueled.
