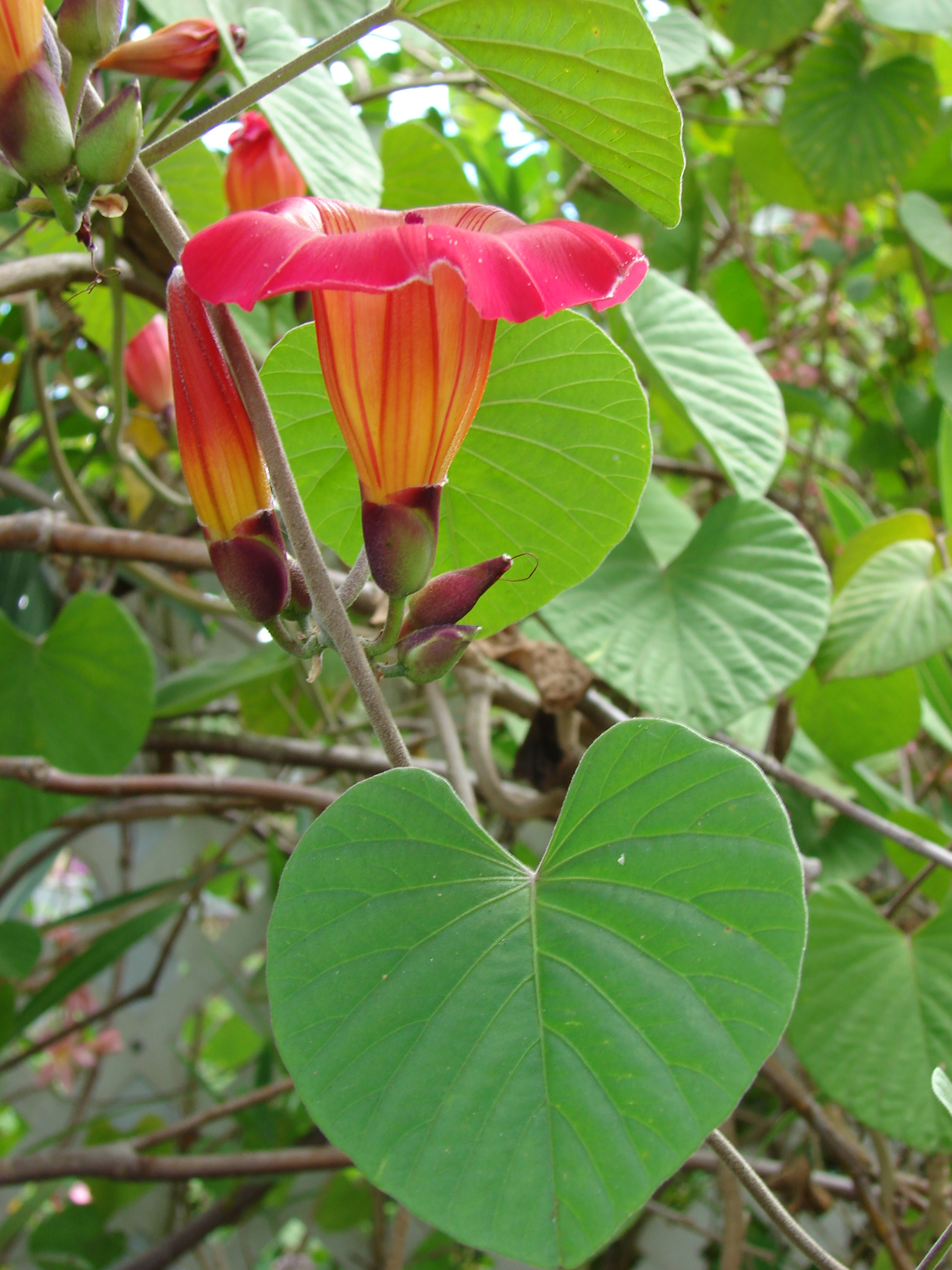

Scientific classification
- Kingdom: Plantae
- Clade: Tracheophytes
- Clade: Angiosperms
- Clade: Eudicots
- Clade: Asterids
- Order: Solanales
- Family: Convolvulaceae
- Genus: Stictocardia
- Species: S. beraviensis

Binomial name
- Stictocardia beraviensis (Vatke) Hallier f.

Synonyms
- Argyreia bagshawei; Argyreia beraviensis; Ipomoea beraviensis; Ipomoea hierniana

= Stictocardia beraviensis =

Species of plant

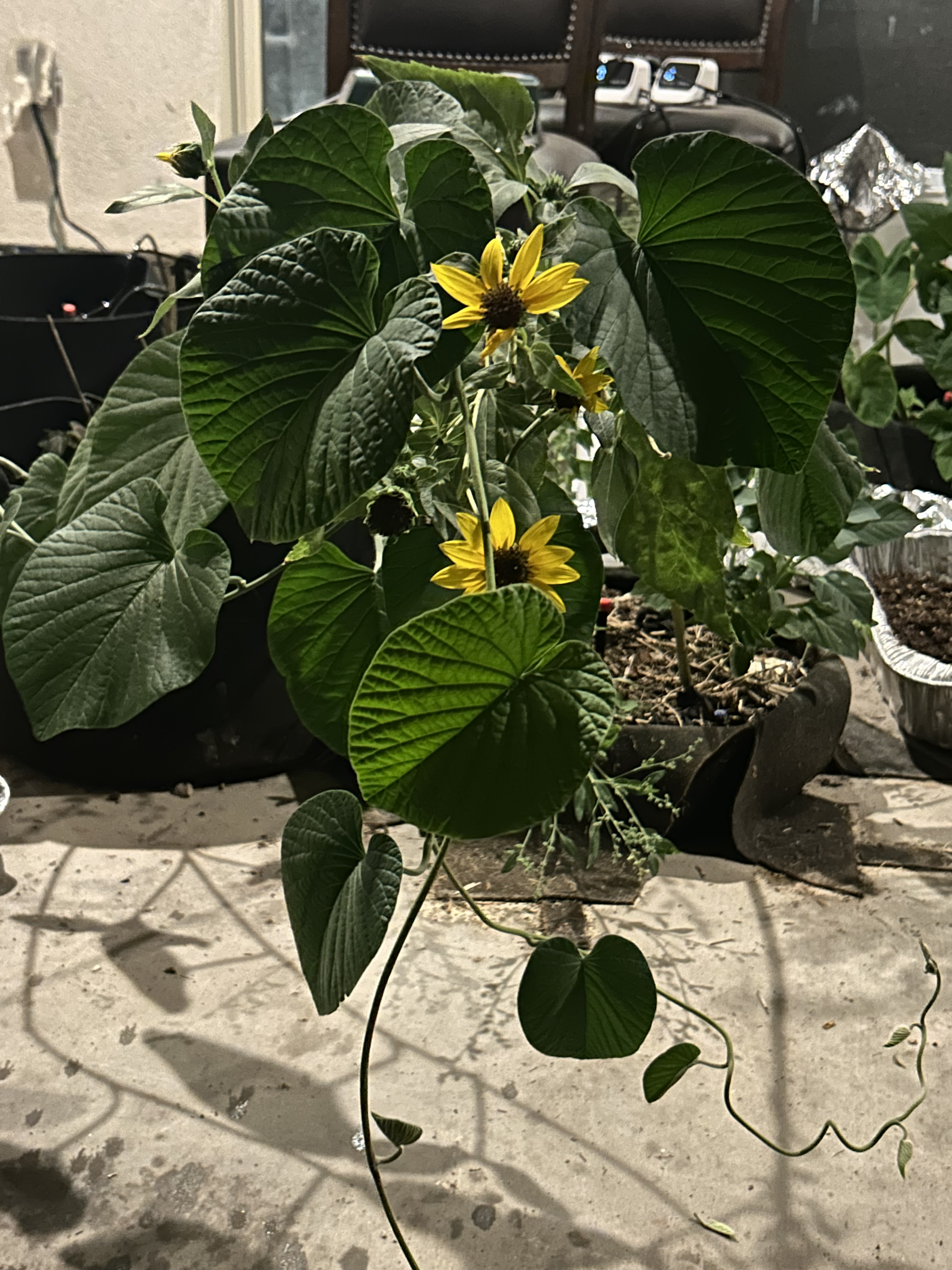
Growing over a sunflower

Stictocardia beraviensis is a species of rapidly growing perennial vining plant in the family Convolvulaceae. It is native to West Africa and Madagascar and widely cultivated elsewhere for its soft, cordate leaves and attractive red flowers. It is commonly called Hawaiian bell vine although this is a misnomer as it is in reality not native to Hawaii.
