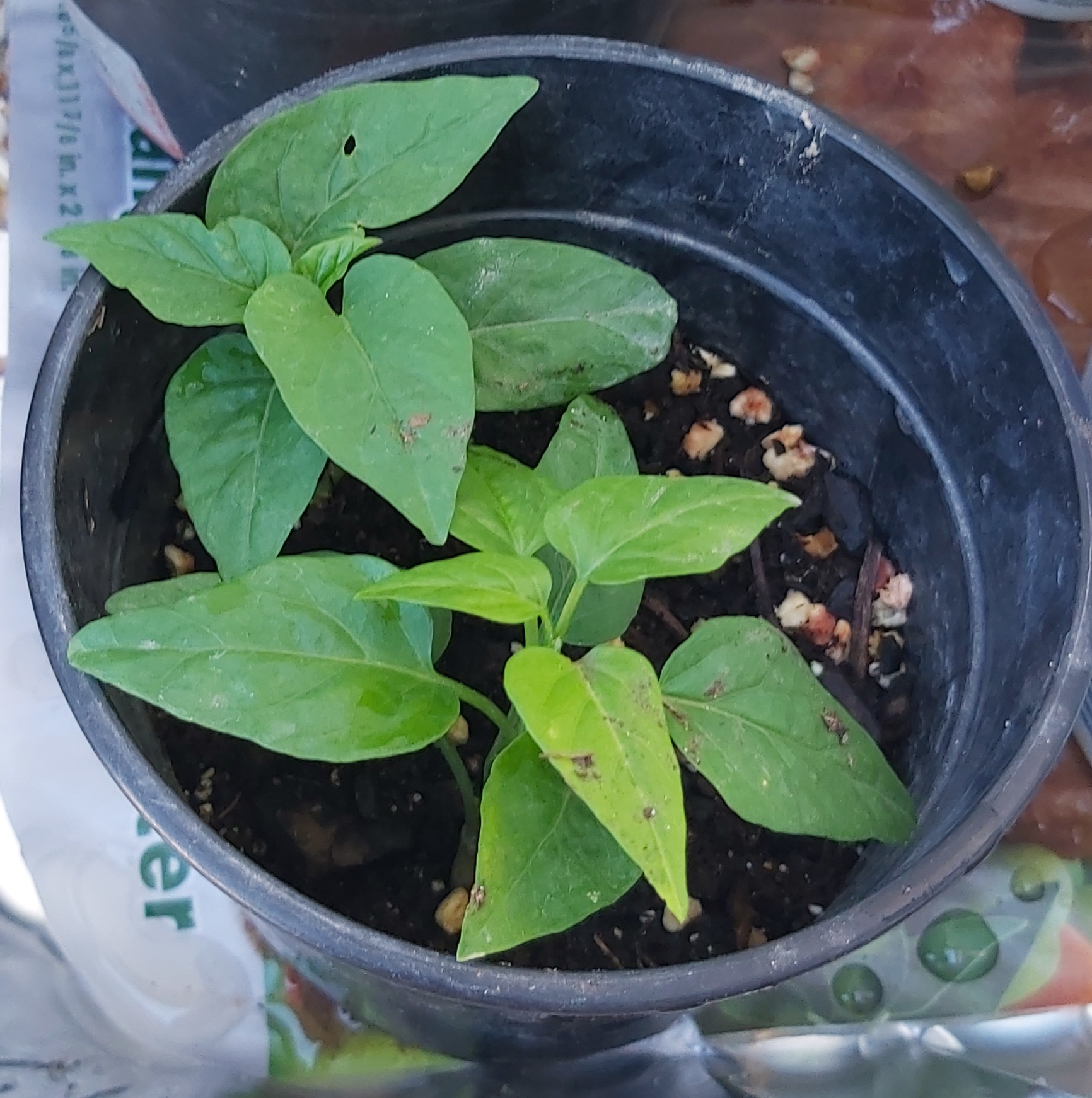
- Seedlings

Scientific classification
- Kingdom: Plantae
- Clade: Tracheophytes
- Clade: Angiosperms
- Clade: Eudicots
- Clade: Asterids
- Order: Solanales
- Family: Convolvulaceae
- Genus: Ipomoea
- Species: I. macrorhiza

Binomial name
- Ipomoea macrorhiza Michx.

= Ipomoea macrorhiza =

Species of morning glory

Ipomea macrorhiza is an extremely rare species of tuberous, night-blooming morning glory native to the Southeastern United States.

== Description ==
This is a vigorous vine with stems growing up to 20 feet long. It has large, tuberous roots and white-and-pink flowers that bloom at night. The leaf shape is highly variable, ranging from triangular to palmate. The seed capsules contain 3-5 pubescent seeds.

== Cultivation ==
This plant is rare and so is not widely cultivated. However, its roots are edible and the plant was cultivated by Native Americans as a food source. I. macrorhiza is also of ornamental value due to its attractive flowers.
