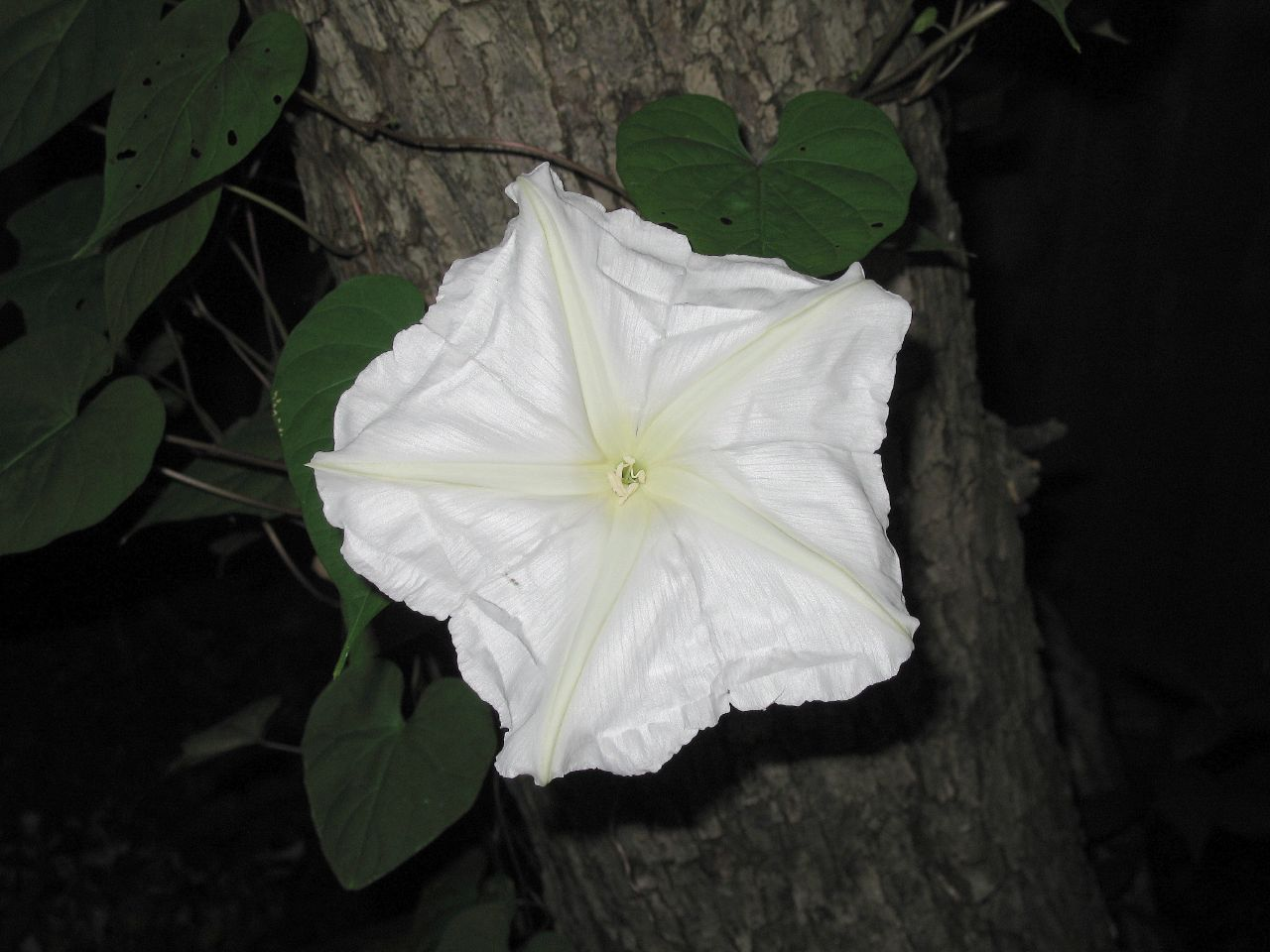

Conservation status
- Least Concern (IUCN 3.1)

- Apparently Secure (NatureServe)

Scientific classification
- Kingdom: Plantae
- Clade: Tracheophytes
- Clade: Angiosperms
- Clade: Eudicots
- Clade: Asterids
- Order: Solanales
- Family: Convolvulaceae
- Genus: Ipomoea
- Species: I. alba

Binomial name
- Ipomoea alba L.

= Ipomoea alba =

Species of plant

Ipomoea alba, known in English as white tropical morning glory, evening glory, moonflower or moonvine, is a species of night-blooming morning glory, native to tropical and subtropical regions of North and South America, from Argentina to northern Mexico, Arizona, Florida and the West Indies. Though formerly classified as genus Calonyction, species aculeatum, it is now properly assigned to genus Ipomoea, subgenus Quamoclit, section Calonyction.

== Description ==
Ipomoea alba is a perennial, herbaceous liana growing to a height of 5–30 m (20–100 ft) tall with twining stems. The leaves are entire or three-lobed, 5–15 cm (2–6 in) long, with a stem 5–20 cm (2–8 in) long. The flowers are fragrant, white or pink, and large, 8–14 cm (3–6 in) diameter. The flowers open quickly in the evening and last through the night, remaining open until touched by the morning dew. On overcast days, the blossoms may remain open for longer. The flowers also tend to remain open longer during cool temperatures, which may also cause the segments to snag or tear as they open.

The seeds are yellowish light brown to nearly black in color and nearly round, 10–12 mm (0.4–0.5 in) long and 8–9 mm (0.3–0.4 in) wide. The seeds are quite buoyant. In an experiment they floated in water for a year and a half.

The leaves, flowers, and seeds are toxic to humans, cats, dogs, and livestock.

=== Names ===
Ipomoea alba is known by a variety of common names. Many of them allude to its night-blooming white flowers, including "moonflower", "moonvine", "white moonflower", and "tropical white morning glory". Though "moonflower" is most often used with Ipomoea alba specifically, it is used for other plants, including those formerly placed in Calonyction and now in genus Ipomoea, Ipomoea muricata, Datura candida, Brugmansia suaveolens, and Selenicereus wittii. The similar "moon-flower" was used in the 1800s as a name for Anemonoides altaica, Leucanthemum vulgare, and Rabelera holostea.

== Historical use ==
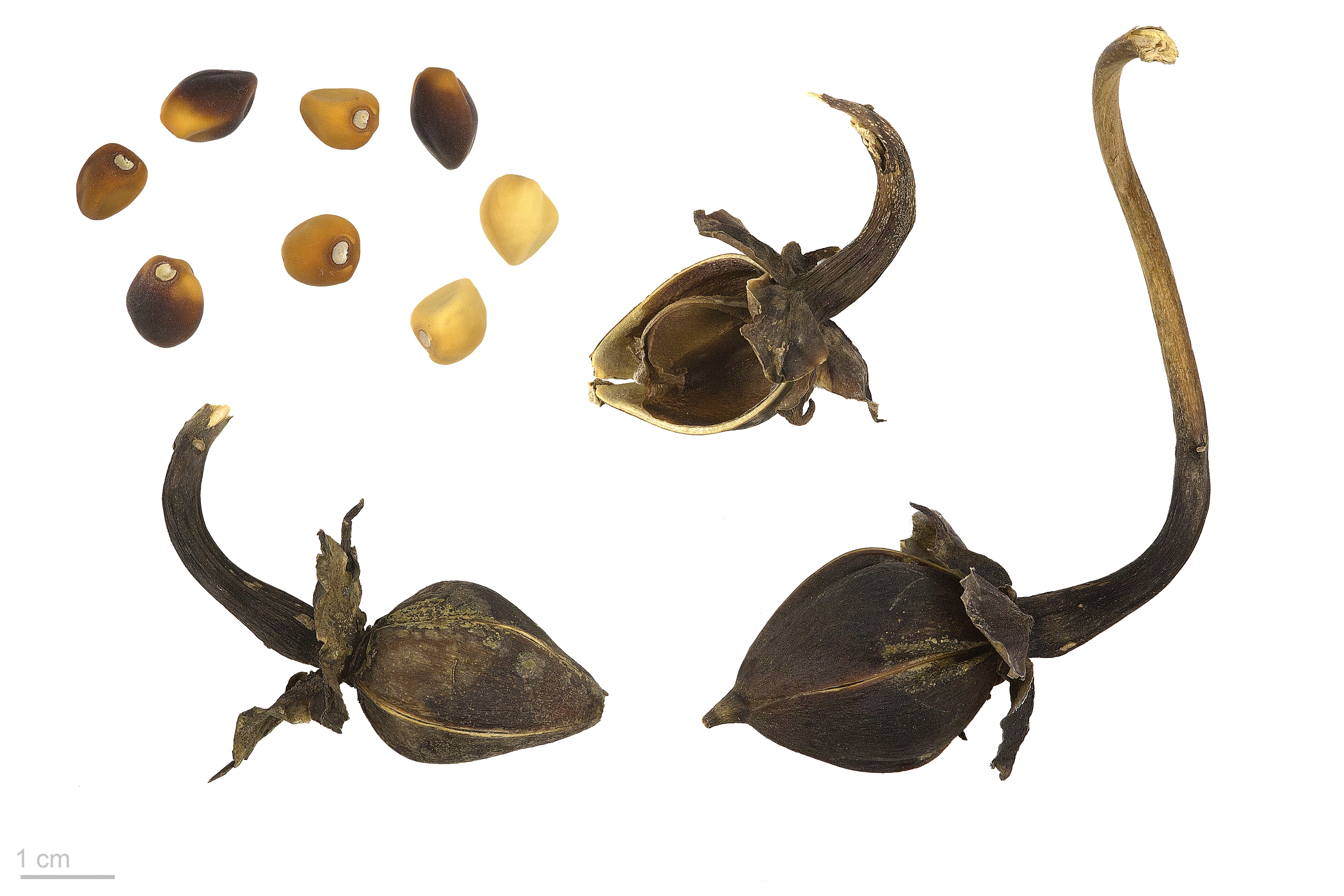
Ipomoea alba – MHNT

The Mesoamerican civilizations used the Ipomoea alba morning glory to convert the latex from the Castilla elastica tree to produce bouncing rubber balls. The sulfur in this morning glory served to cross-link the rubber, a process predating Charles Goodyear's discovery of vulcanization by at least 3,000 years.

== Cultivation ==
The species is widely cultivated as an ornamental plant for its flowers. In areas too cold for winter survival, it can be grown as an annual plant. Since it is of tropical origin, it flowers best under a summer short-day photoperiod. Though it can be successfully flowered in the north, its flowering is impaired by excessively long summer days. Thus, at higher latitudes it often does not set buds and bloom until early autumn, when daylight length is once again near 12 hours.

Propagation is usually by seed. The seed resembles a small, brownish nut, and should be nicked with a file and then soaked overnight before planting.

In some areas, the plant is an invasive species which can cause problems in agricultural settings.
