= Cardinal climber =

Cardinal climber is a common name for several plants and may refer to:

- Ipomoea × multifida
- Ipomoea × sloteri

== See also ==
- Cardinal creeper (Ipomoea horsfalliae)
- Cardinal vine (Ipomoea quamoclit)
