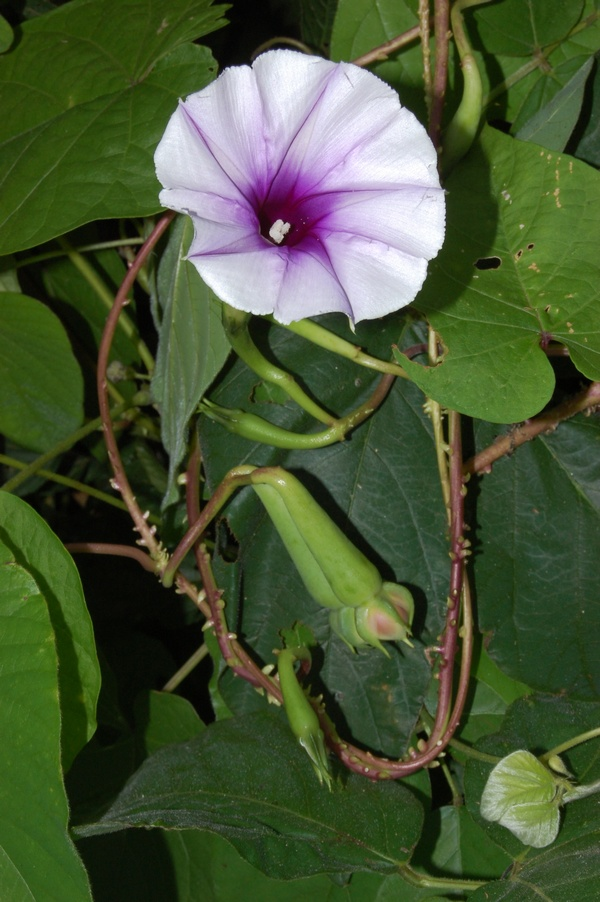

Scientific classification
- Kingdom: Plantae
- Clade: Tracheophytes
- Clade: Angiosperms
- Clade: Eudicots
- Clade: Asterids
- Order: Solanales
- Family: Convolvulaceae
- Genus: Ipomoea
- Species: I. muricata

Binomial name
- Ipomoea muricata (L.) Jacq., Pl. Hort. Schoenbr.(1798)

Synonyms
- Homotypic Synonyms; Bonanox muricata (L.) Raf.; Calonyction muricatum (L.) G.Don; Calonyction speciosum var. muricatum (L.) Choisy; Convolvulus muricatus L.; Convolvulus smilacifolius Salisb.; Ipomoea turbinata Lag.; Leptocallis quinata G.Don Heterotypic Synonyms; Calonyction longiflorum Hassk.; Calonyction pseudomuricatum (Bernh. ex Link) G.Don; Convolvulus colubrinus Blanco, Fl. Filip.; Convolvulus petiolaris Kunth, F.W.H.von Humboldt; Ipomoea bona-nox var. purpurascens Ker Gawl.; Ipomoea calderonii Standl.; Ipomoea kirkiana Britten; Ipomoea petiolaris (Kunth) G.Don; Ipomoea pseudomuricata Bernh. ex Link; Ipomoea shirensis Baker; Ipomoea spinulosa Brandegee; Ipomoea tubiflora Hook.f.

= Ipomoea muricata =

Plant species

Ipomoea muricata, also called lavender moonvine, is a climbing vine in the genus Ipomoea, the same genus that contains the various morning glory species and sweet potato. It is native to Central America, but now distributed widely across the tropics and subtropics.

== Morphology ==
Ipomoea muricata is a fast annual climber, with funnel-shaped and white, reddish or lilac flowers, reminiscent of the color of lavender. The stems are twining and muricate. The leaf texture is glabrous, and its shape is ovate or orbicular.

== Uses ==
The various parts of the plant are used as food, medicine and poison by the peoples of its native and expanded range. In the Indian state of Kerala, the plant is called clove bean or nithya vazhutana and the swollen peduncles are consumed, typically pan-fried or as a thoran.
