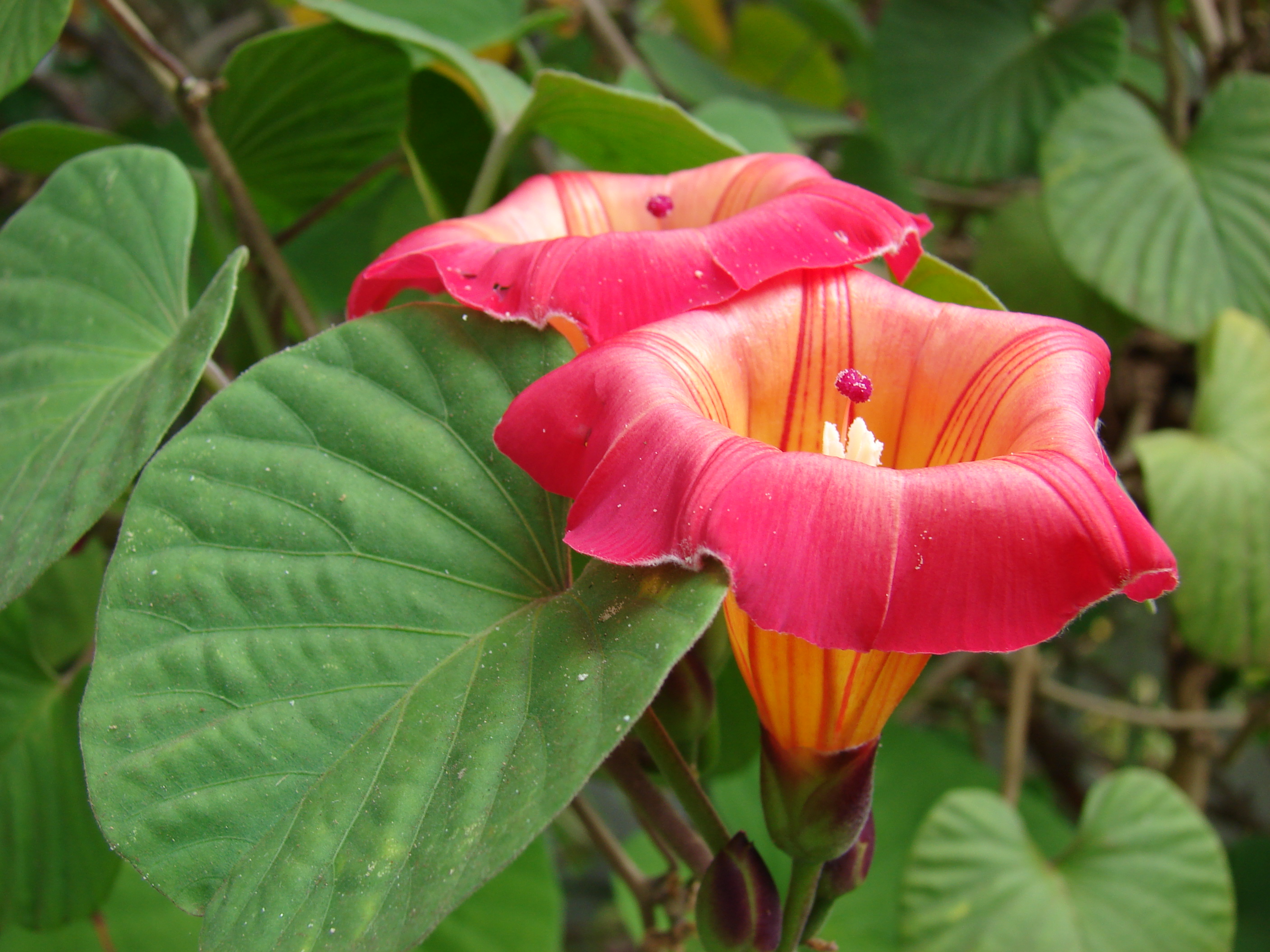
- Stictocardia beraviensis

Scientific classification
- Kingdom: Plantae
- Clade: Tracheophytes
- Clade: Angiosperms
- Clade: Eudicots
- Clade: Asterids
- Order: Solanales
- Family: Convolvulaceae
- Tribe: Ipomoeeae
- Genus: Stictocardia; Hallier f.

= Stictocardia =

Genus of flowering plants

Stictocardia is a genus of flowering plants belonging to the family Convolvulaceae.

Its native range is Tropical and Subtropical Old World to Pacific.

Species:

- Stictocardia beraviensis (Vatke) Hallier f.
- Stictocardia cordatosepala Ooststr.
- Stictocardia discolor Ooststr.
- Stictocardia incomta (Hallier f.) Hallier f.
- Stictocardia laxiflora (Baker) Hallier f.
- Stictocardia lutambensis (Schulze-Menz) Verdc.
- Stictocardia macalusoi (Mattei) Verdc.
- Stictocardia mojangensis (Vatke) D.F.Austin & Eich
- Stictocardia neglecta Ooststr.
- Stictocardia queenslandica (Domin) R.W.Johnson
- Stictocardia sivarajanii Biju, Pushp. & P.Mathew
- Stictocardia tiliifolia (Desr.) Hallier f.
