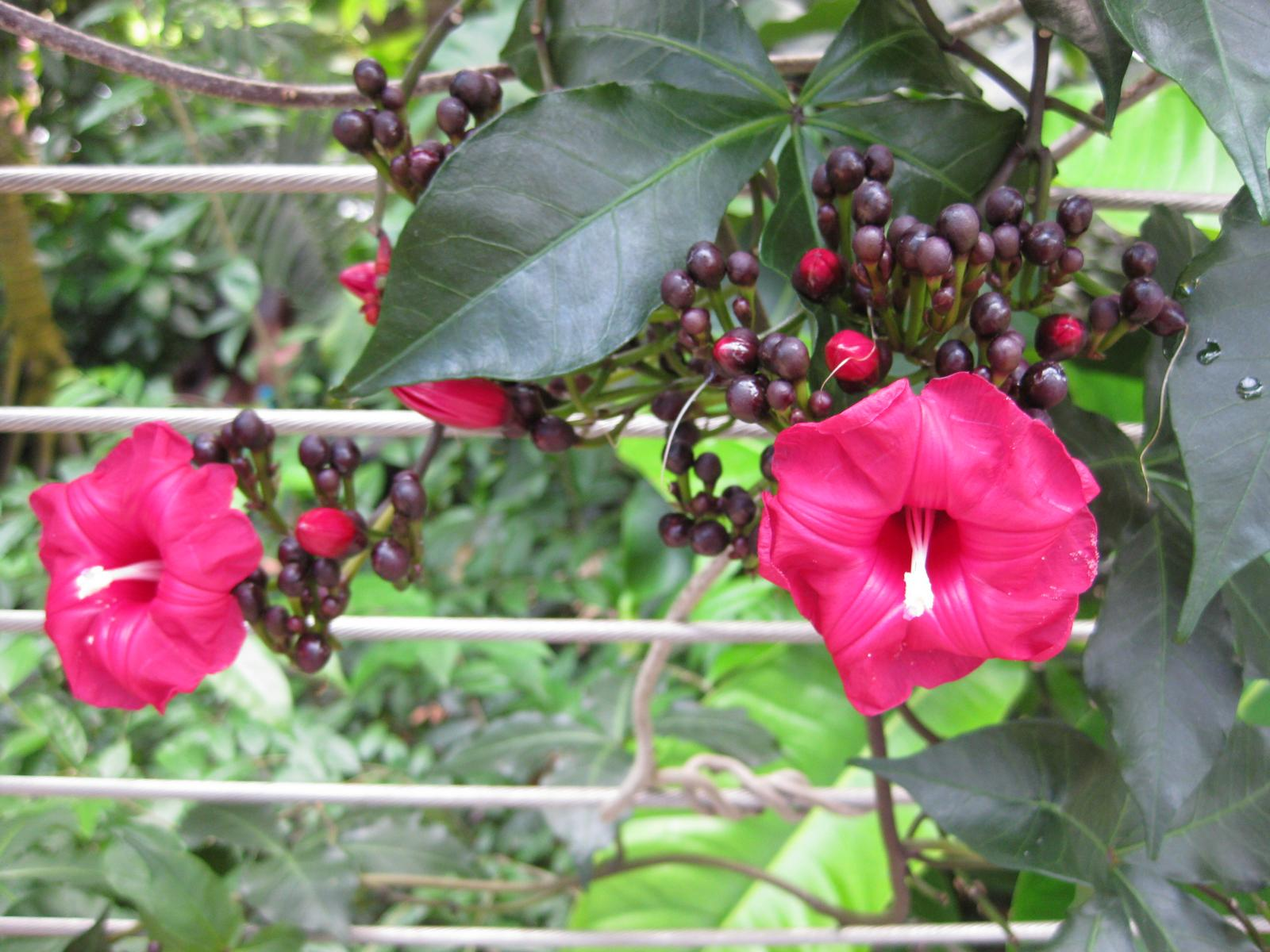

Scientific classification
- Kingdom: Plantae
- Clade: Tracheophytes
- Clade: Angiosperms
- Clade: Eudicots
- Clade: Asterids
- Order: Solanales
- Family: Convolvulaceae
- Genus: Ipomoea
- Species: I. horsfalliae

Binomial name
- Ipomoea horsfalliae Hook.

= Ipomoea horsfalliae =

Species of flowering plant

Ipomea horsfalliae is a flowering plant in the family Convolvulaceae known by several common names including Lady Doorly's morning glory, cardinal creeper, and Prince Kuhio vine. It is native to the Caribbean and Brazil.

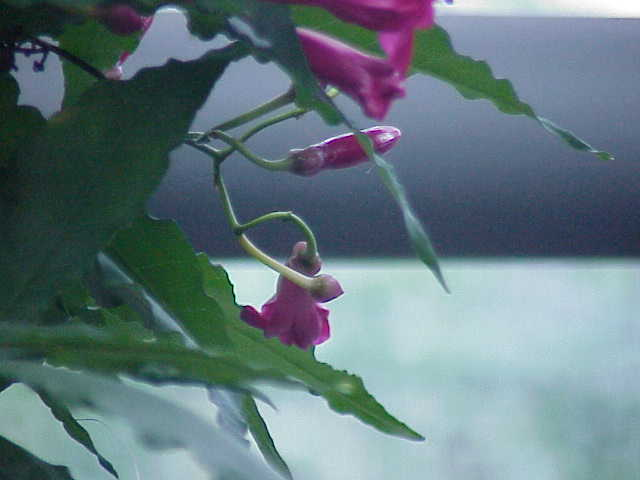

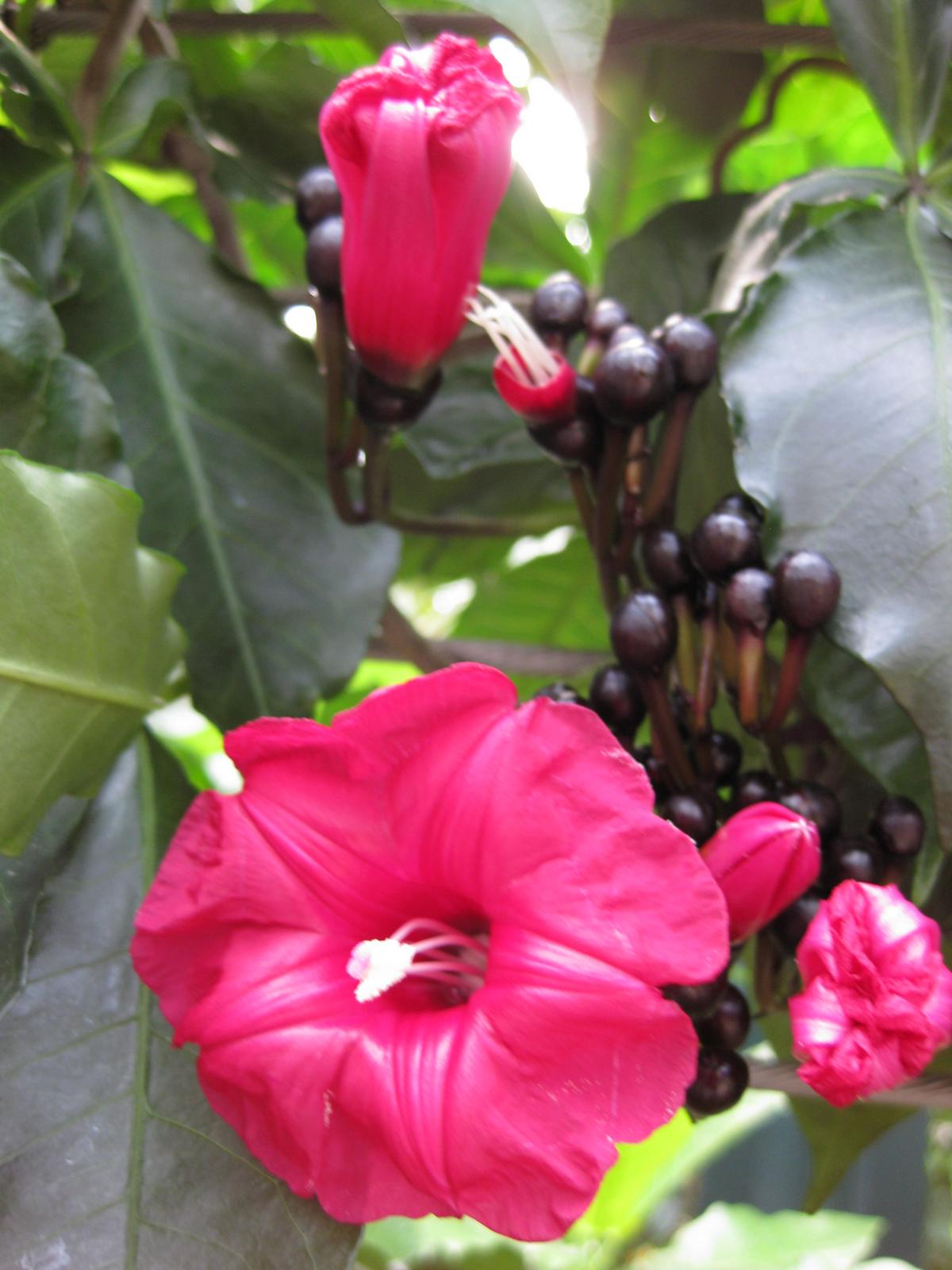

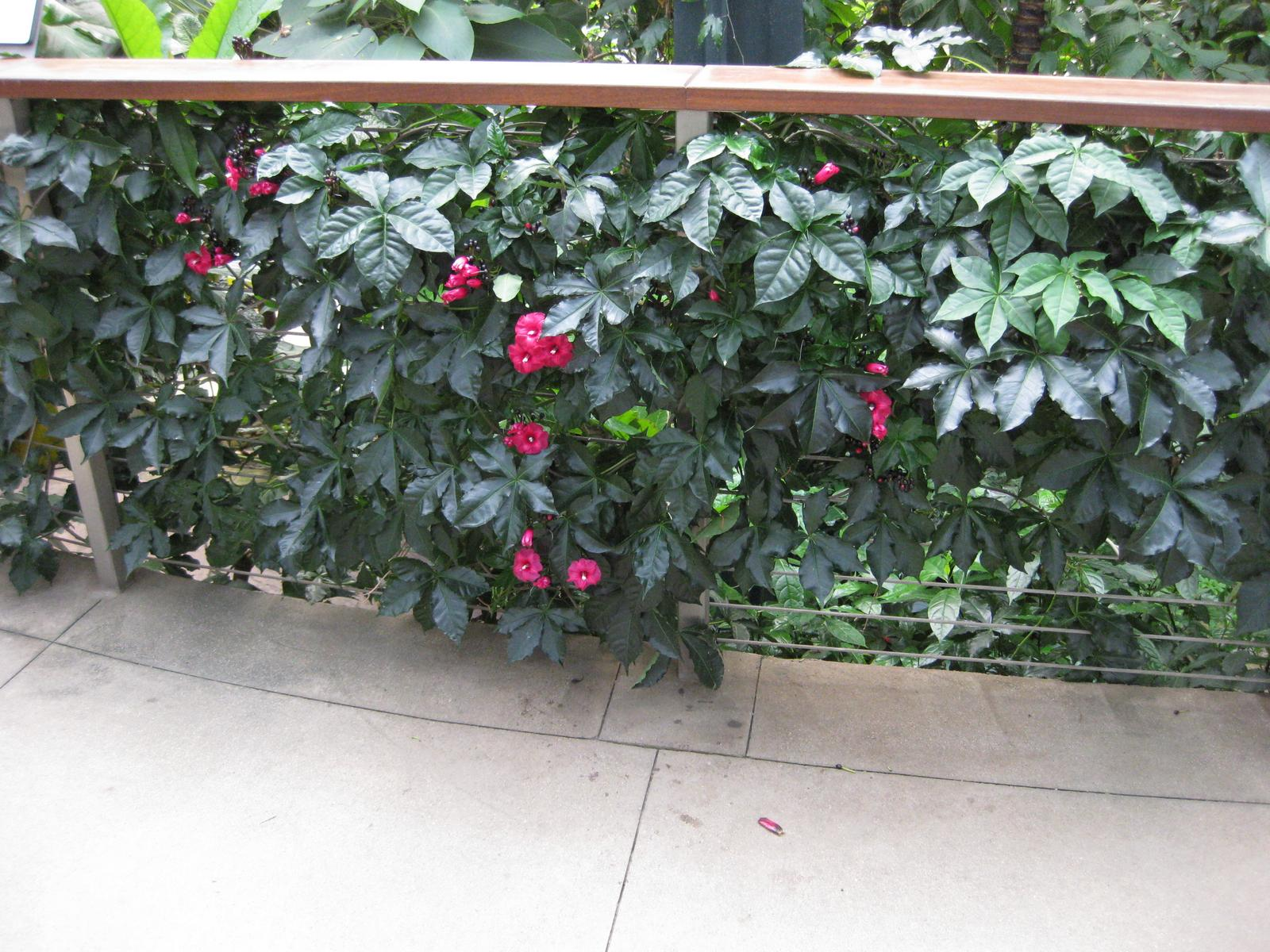
