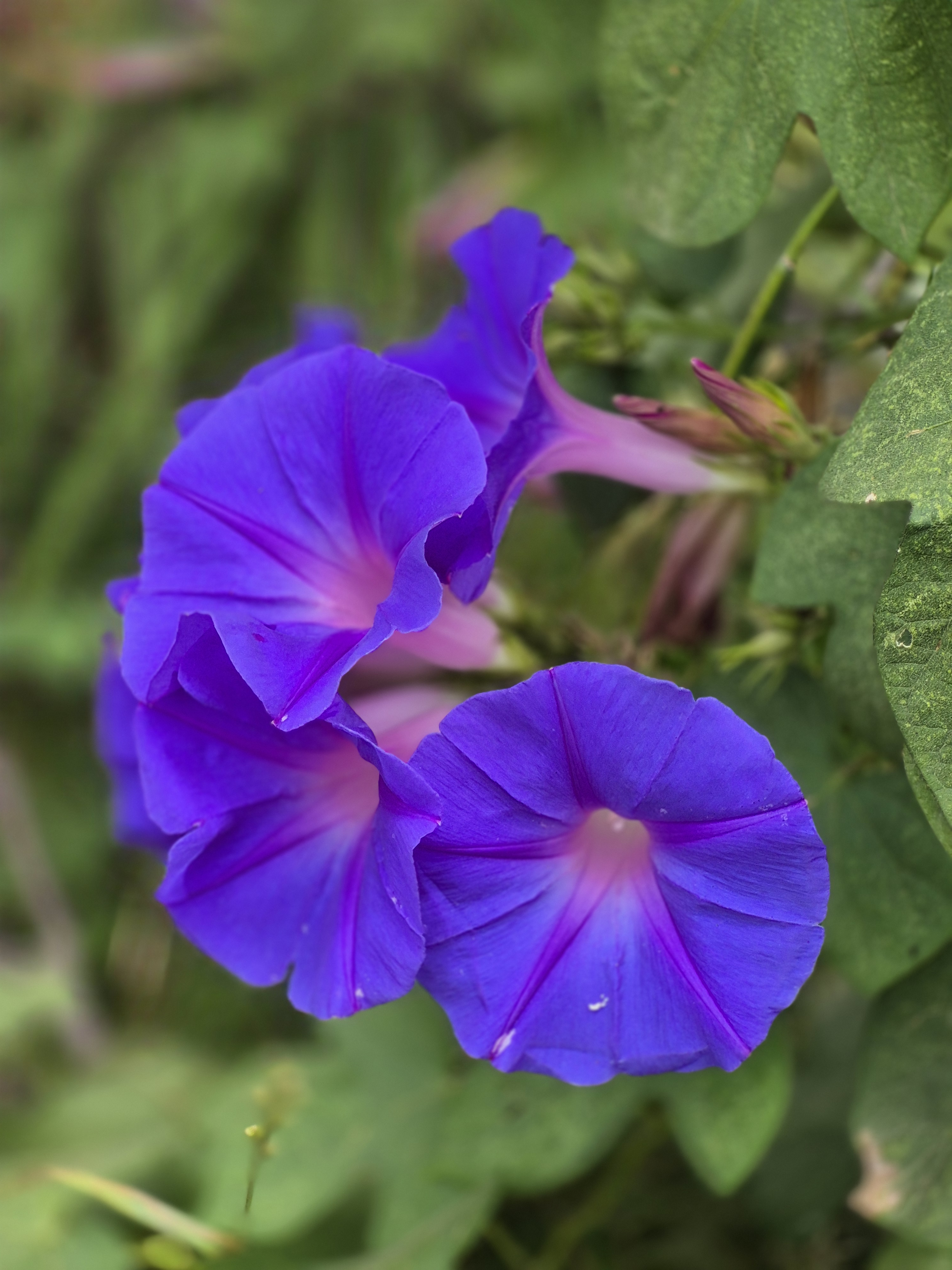
- Ipomoea indica in Brazil
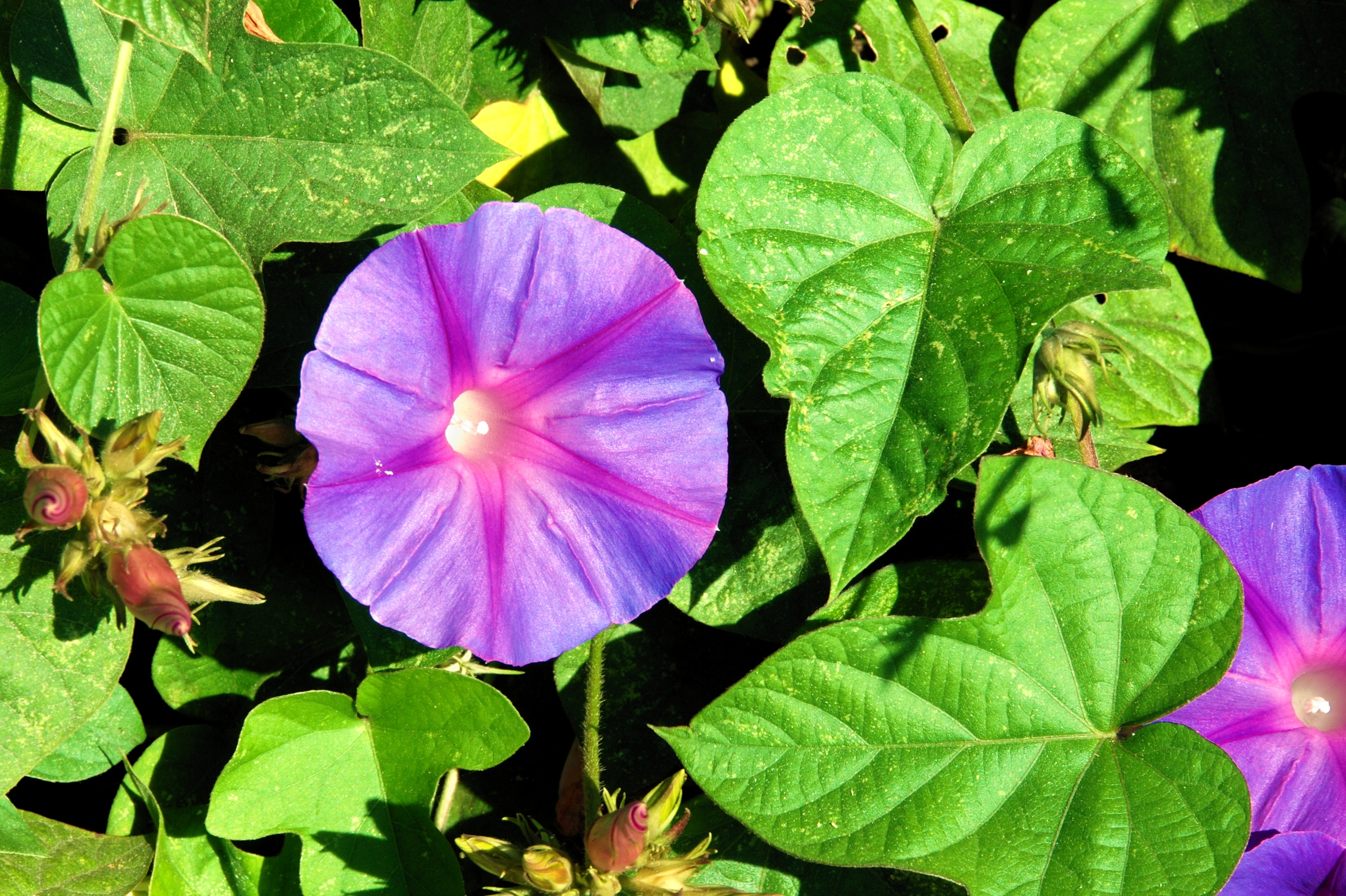
- Blue morning glory and its leaves

Scientific classification
- Kingdom: Plantae
- Clade: Embryophytes
- Clade: Tracheophytes
- Clade: Spermatophytes
- Clade: Angiosperms
- Clade: Eudicots
- Clade: Asterids
- Order: Solanales
- Family: Convolvulaceae
- Genus: Ipomoea
- Species: I. indica

Binomial name
- Ipomoea indica (Burm.f.) Merr.

Synonyms
- Ipomoea acuminata (Vahl) Roem. & Schult.; Ipomoea cathartica Poir.; Ipomoea congesta R.Br.; Ipomoea indica var. acuminata (Vahl) Fosberg; Ipomoea learii Lindl.; Ipomoea mutablilis Lindl.; Pharbitis cathartica (Poir.) Choisy

= Ipomoea indica =

Species of flowering plant

Ipomoea indica is a species of flowering plant in the family Convolvulaceae, known by several common names, including blue morning glory, oceanblue morning glory, koali awa, and blue dawn flower. It bears heart-shaped or three-lobed leaves and purple or blue funnel-shaped flowers 6–8 cm (2–3 in) in diameter, from spring to autumn. The flowers produced by the plant are hermaphroditic. This plant has gained the Royal Horticultural Society's Award of Garden Merit.

The plant is grown as an ornamental for its attractive flowers, but is considered invasive in many regions of the world, being specifically listed on New Zealand's Biosecurity Act 1993.

== Etymology ==
The Latin specific epithet indica means from India, or the East Indies or China. In this case, the name likely refers to the West Indies, as I. indica is native to the New World.

== Description ==
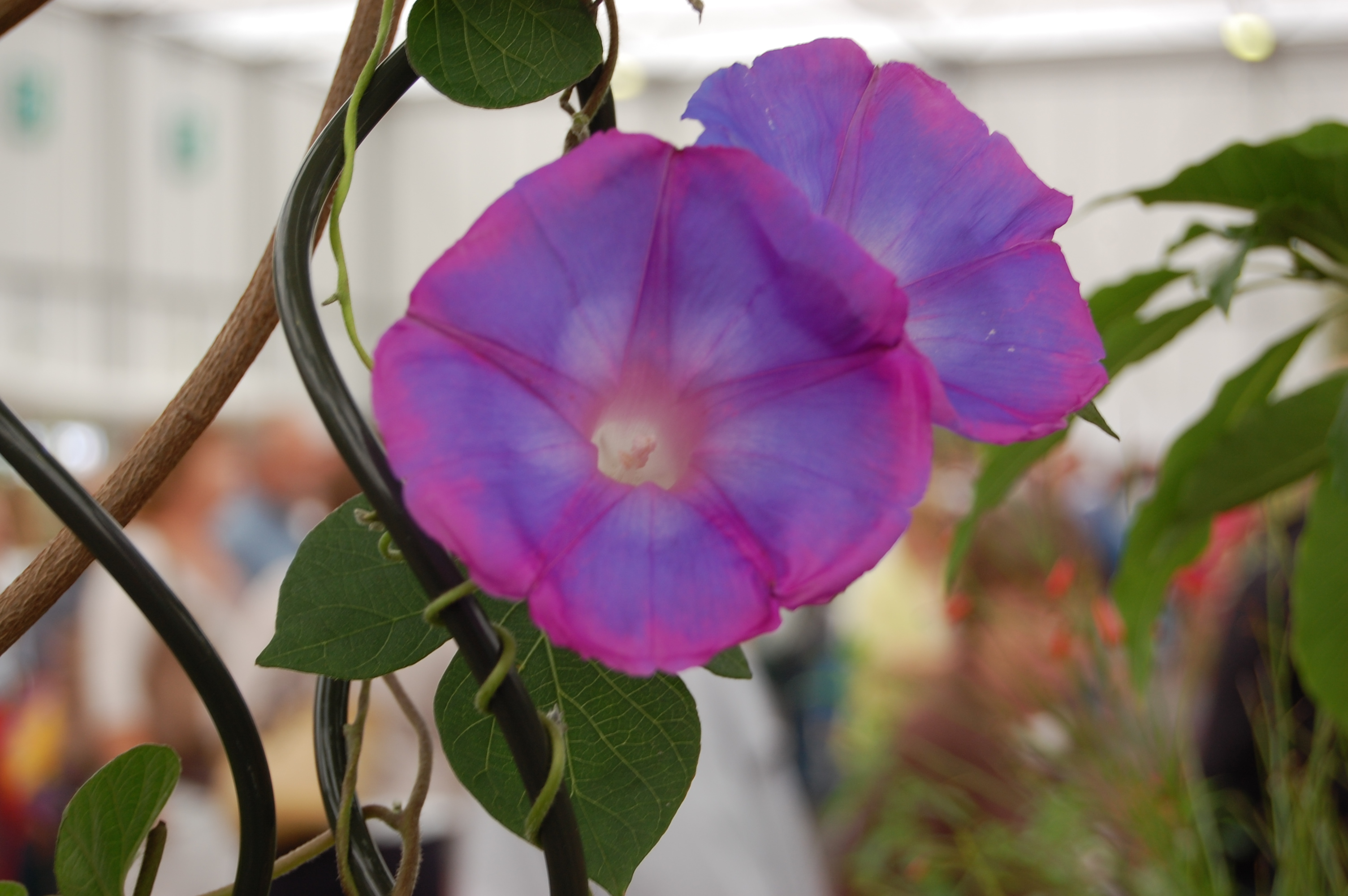
At the BBC Gardeners' World show in June 2011, with tendrils visible wrapped around the black metal support

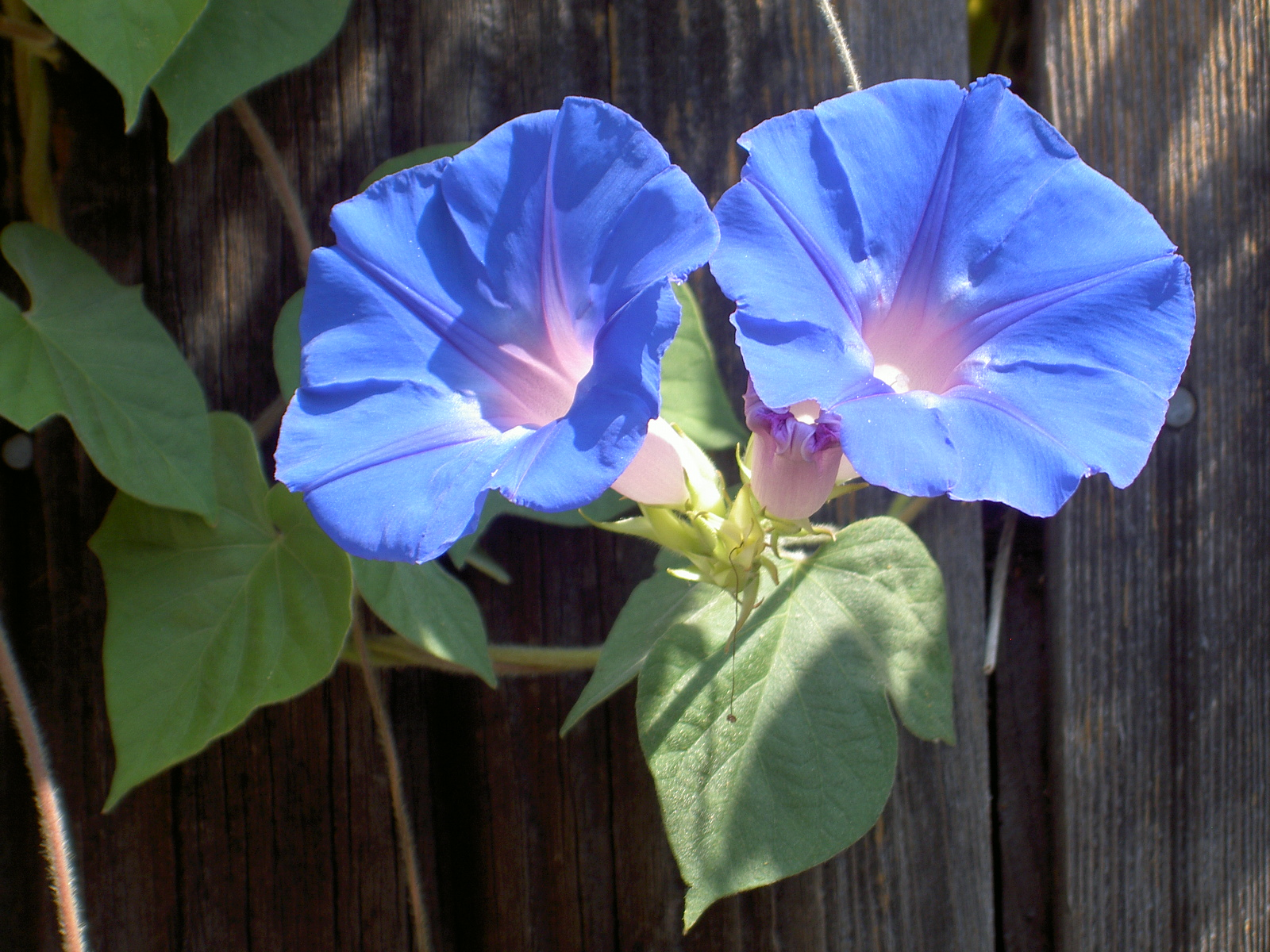

Ipomoea indica is a vigorous, long-lived, tender, perennial plant, a vine which is native to tropical, subtropical and warm temperate habitats throughout the world. It blooms all year long. They can most commonly be found in disturbed forests, forest edges, secondary woodland, suburban gullies, and along roadsides and waterways. The plant climbs well over other plants, walls and slopes as growing on the bottom. Its climbing habit allows it to compete with trees and shrubs successfully. It is a twisting, occasionally lying, herbaceous plant which is more or less densely hairy on the axial parts with backward-looking trichomes. The stems can grow 3 to 6 centimetres (1.2 to 2.4 in) long and sometimes have roots at the nodes.

The leaves are petiolate with 2 to 18 centimetres (0.79 to 7.09 in) long petioles. The leaf blade is egg-shaped or round, 5 to 15 centimetres (2.0 to 5.9 in) long and 3.5 to 14 centimetres (1.4 to 5.5 in) wide. The underside is densely hairy with short, soft trichomes, the top is more or less sparsely hairy. The base is heart-shaped, the leaf margin is entire or three-lobed, the tip is pointed or sharply pointed.

The crown is funnel-shaped, 5 to 8 centimetres (2.0 to 3.1 in) long, glabrous, bright blue or bluish purple, with age they become reddish purple or red. The centre of the crown is a little paler.

I. indica is a long-lived plant that can live up to 25 years.

=== Inflorescence and fruit ===
The inflorescences are dense, umbelliform cymes from a few flowers. The inflorescence stems are 4 to 20 centimetres (1.6 to 7.9 in) long. The bracts are linear or sometimes lanceolate. The flower stems are 2 to 5 millimetres (0.079 to 0.197 in) (rarely up to 8 millimetres (0.31 in)) long. The sepals are almost uniform, 1.4 to 2.2 cm long and slowly sharpened linearly. They are hairless to close-fitting, the outer three sepals are lanceolate to broadly lanceolate, and the inner two are narrowly lanceolate. The stamens and the stamp do not protrude beyond the crown. The ovary is hairless. The scar is three-lobed. The flowers change colour, where they start out as bright blue early in the morning, shifting to a darker shade of blue in midday, then to a lavender blue and finally to a deep pink at the end of the day.

The fruits are more or less spherical capsules with a diameter of 1 to 1.3 centimetres (0.39 to 0.51 in). The seeds are about 5 millimetres (0.20 in) in size and are dispersed via rain, wind, human activity, gravity, and waterways.

Flowering and fruiting are dependent on location. Some countries, such as Costa Rica and Nicaragua, observe year round flowering and fruiting while other countries like South Africa observe fruiting and flowering that is constrained to specific months. Generally however, they bloom throughout the year, but much more profusely so from late spring to fall.

== Taxonomy and phylogenetics ==
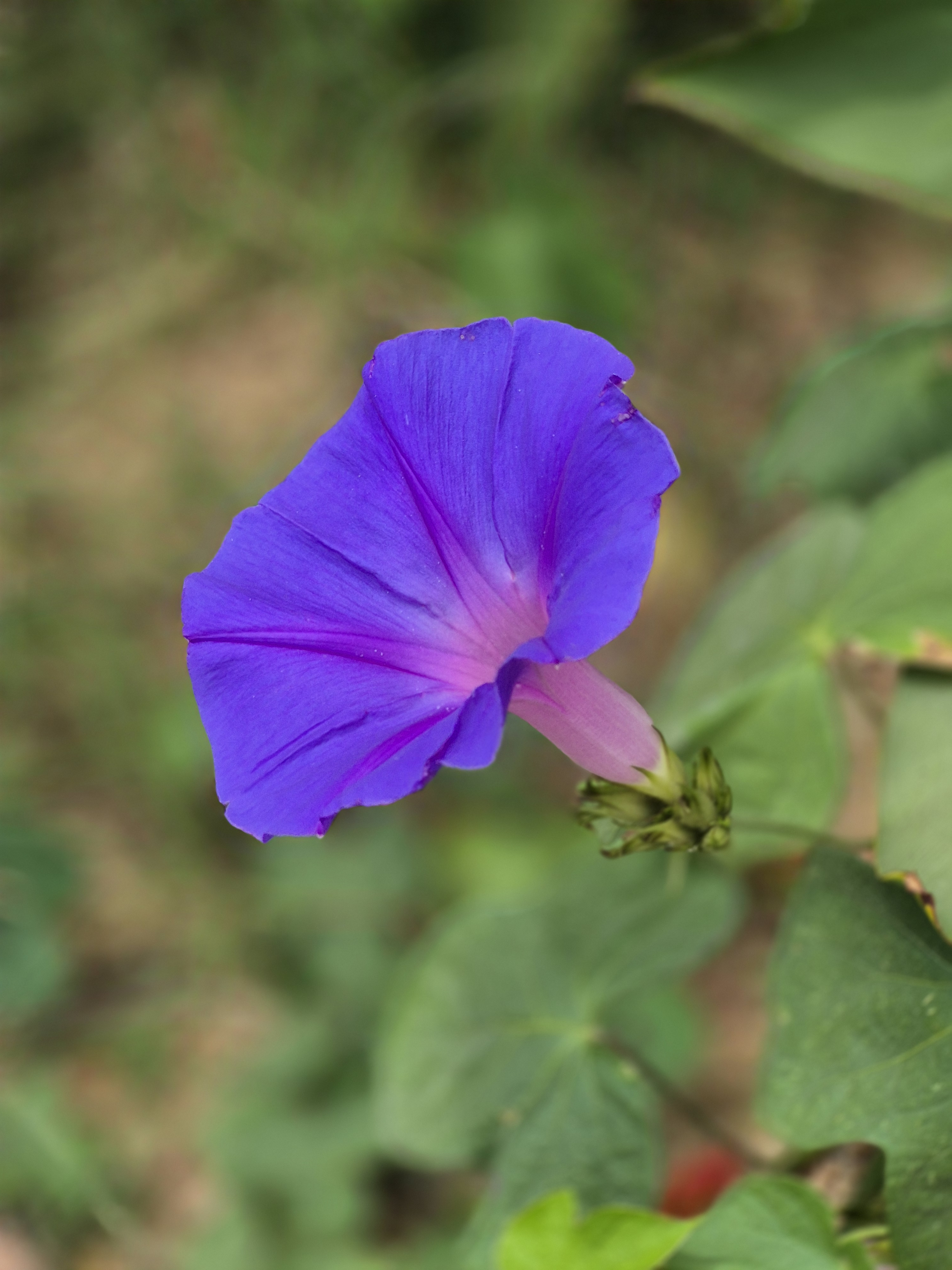
Single flower in Brazil

Ipomoea is a large and diverse genus containing between 600–1,000 species, with 820 being recognized by the Catalogue of Life. Although the genus as a whole is not monophyletic, I. indica belongs to a well-supported clade of the Pharbitis section in the Quamoclit subgenus. A 2014 phylogenetic study on 36 members of the Quamoclit subgenus (30% of the species). The results suggest I. indica's closest living relatives to be the ivy-leaved and picotee morning glories.

- I. orizabensis
- - I. parasitica
  - - - I. ampullacea
      - I. mairetti
    - - I. neurocephala
      - - - I. lindheimeri
          - - I. pubescens
            - I. purpurea
        - - - I. indica
            - I. hederacea
          - I. nil

== Distribution ==
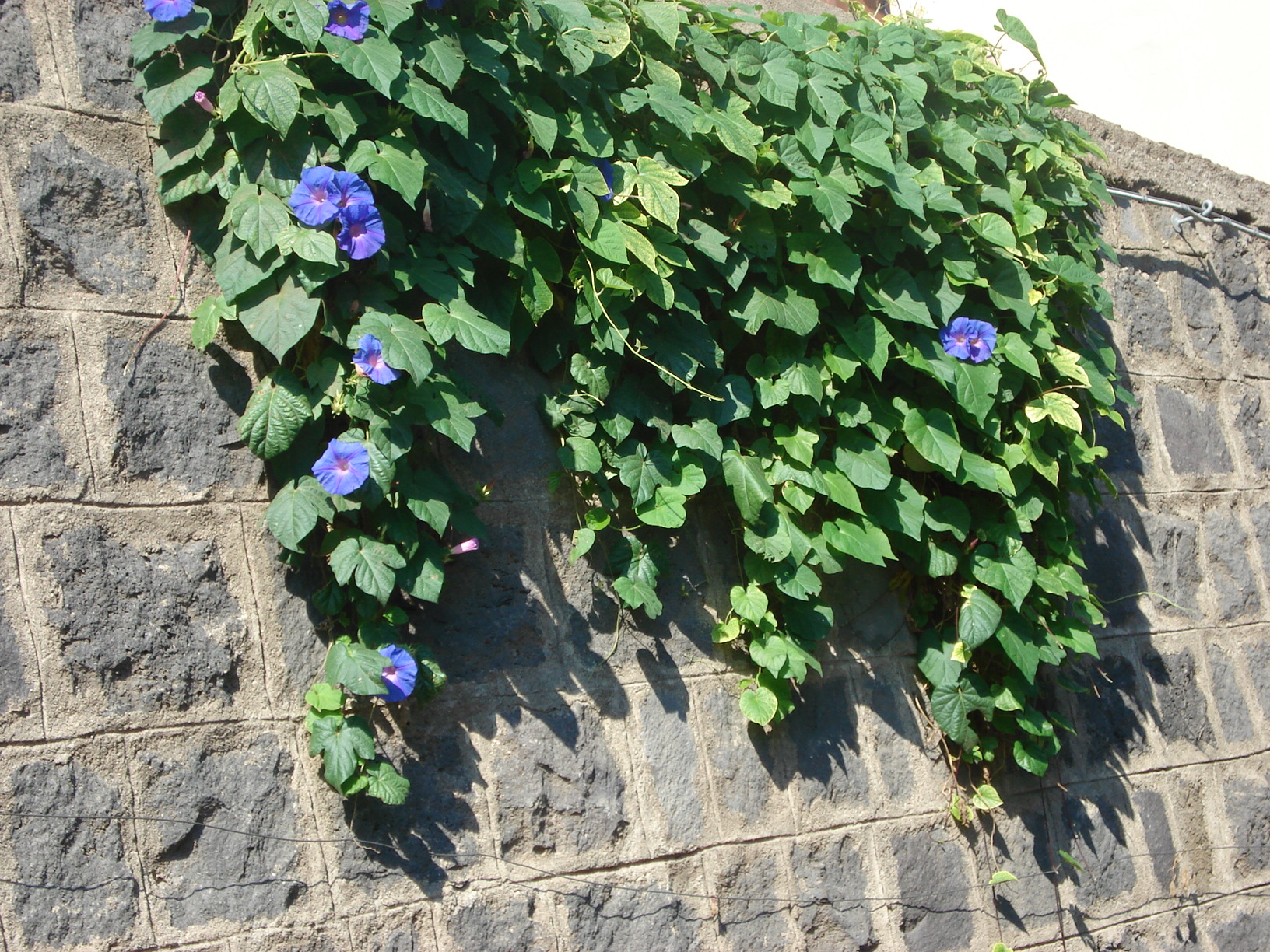

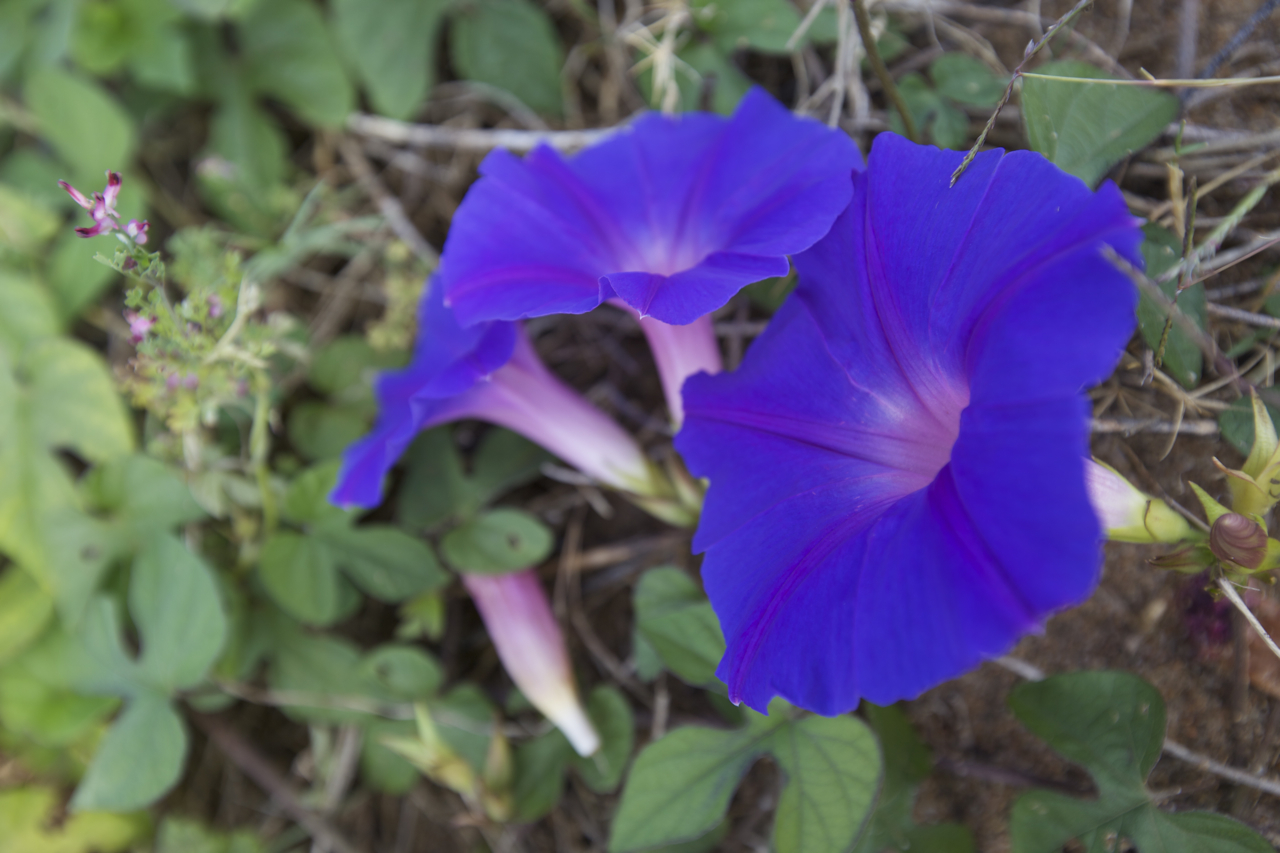
Uruguay

Its exact native distribution is unclear due to it being widely cultivated throughout the tropics of Eurasia, Africa and America, but it is currently thought by most authorities to be native to the Neotropics, from Florida in the United States south to Mexico, Central America, and the Caribbean and south to South America. It is also considered native to several Pacific islands, including Palau, the Hawaiian Archipelago (where its native Hawaiian name is Koali ‘awa), French Polynesia, and Micronesia.

However, other authorities consider it to be an introduced and/or invasive species in the United States, Mexico, and parts of its Caribbean and Pacific range.

== Invasive species ==
Ipomoea indica has become a noxious weed and invasive plant species in Australia, California, China, Ethiopia, France, Greece, Italy, Kenya, Mexico, Montenegro, New Caledonia, New Zealand, Portugal, South Africa, Tanzania, and Uganda. In New Zealand, it is classed as an unwanted organism under the Biosecurity Act 1993 and it is therefore illegal to sell, propagate and distribute the plant. It is listed on the National Pest Plant Accord for New Zealand.

When growing in optimal conditions, the plant is able to spread via seeds, stolons, and stem fragments. I. indica is capable of producing a very large amounts of seeds for dispersal. These seeds are easily germinated, giving the plant the ability to rapidly invade and colonize new land. It can grow over pre-existing trees, shrubs, and other plant species. I. indica successfully outcompetes many native plants for substrates, nutrients, sunlight and water. The stolons of blue morning glory create a thick mat over ground plants, reducing the light available for those plants. The stolons of blue morning glory are also capable of growing at a rapid pace, adding to the plant's succession. Each part can grow as a separate plant if snapped during the process of attempted removal.

The only natural enemy of I. indica is the oomycete plant pathogen Albugo ipomoeae-panduratae, which have shown instances of infecting the plant. Its lack of natural enemies is another reason I. indica is very successful and adds to its invasive abilities.

== Cultivation ==
Blue morning glory is a popular species widely cultivated as an ornamental plant for its colourful flowers. It has spread throughout the tropics and subtropics of the Old World although those regions are not part of its native range. As it does not tolerate temperatures below 7 °C (45 °F), in temperate regions it is grown under glass. It likes very light and nutrient-rich soil, which should be kept evenly moist.

=== Uses ===
Ipomoea indica is an ideal plant for honey production because it blooms all year long

== See also ==
- Ipomoea purpurea
- Invasive species in New Zealand
- Gardening in New Zealand
