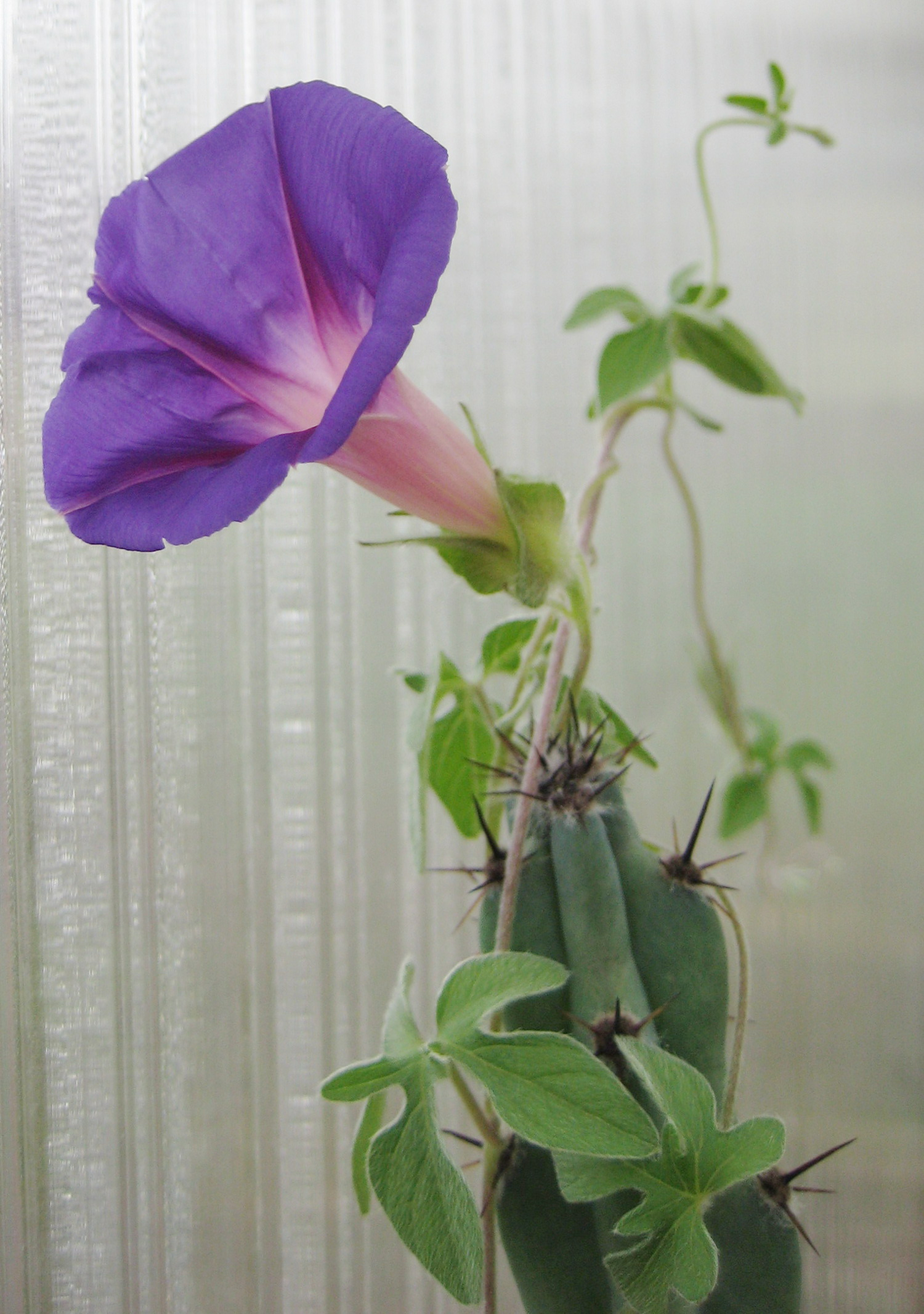

Scientific classification
- Kingdom: Plantae
- Clade: Tracheophytes
- Clade: Angiosperms
- Clade: Eudicots
- Clade: Asterids
- Order: Solanales
- Family: Convolvulaceae
- Genus: Ipomoea
- Species: I. pubescens

Binomial name
- Ipomoea pubescens Lam. 1793

= Ipomoea pubescens =

Species of flowering plant

Ipomoea pubescens, the silky morning glory, is a species of flowering plant belonging to the family Convolvulaceae.

== Description ==
Ipomoea pubescens is a herbaceous, perennial, twining vine with a relatively large root. The egg-shaped leaves are 3-5-lobed, with cordate bases, and up to 8 cm long (~3 inches) and 9 cm wide (3½ inches). Leaves are covered with relatively long hairs, which sometimes have a silky feeling. Flowers have blue to violet, funnel-shaped corollas up to 8 cm long (~3 inches) and 7 cm wide (2¾ inches)

== Distribution ==
The map on the iNaturalist information page for Ipomoea pubescens shows the locations of research-grade observations of the species in two disjunct regions. In the north it occurs from mountainous southwestern USA (Arizona, New Mexico & Texas) south through the Mexican higlands into Oaxaca state. Apparently the species is absent from Central America, but reappears in mountainous western South America from Colombia south to northern Argentina.

== Habitat ==
In the US, silky morning glories are described as inhabiting rocky sites, stream beds and oak woodlands at elevations of 100-1600m (~330–5240 ft). In Mexico it's found in semi-arid scrub, oak and pine forests, and tropical deciduous forests at 1450-2500m (~4750–8200 ft). In South America, in Argentina it's reported from the Yungas bioregion, a warm, forested area along the eastern slope of the Andes Mountains, the Argentine Monte, which is a dry, thorn scrub and grassland ecoregion, and the Prepuna, which is a region of dry, mountainous ravines in northwestern Argentina, between 1500 ad 2000m (~4900–6600 ft).

== Human uses ==
=== As food ===
Traditionally, in the Andes, the roots have been eaten raw.

=== As medicine ===
In Mexico, in the historical classic Historia de las Plantas de la Nueva España, written by Francisco Hernández de Toledo after his first exploration of Mexico from 1571 to 1576, it's written that the root, which has warm properties and a pleasant taste, when crushed and taken in doses of one ounce with water, purges all humors through the lower duct, without harm or discomfort.

== Etymology ==
The genus name Ipomoea is derived from the Greek ips meaning "worm," and homoios for "resembling" -- "resembling a worm." Probably this refers to the sprawling underground roots often produced by species of this genus, though it could be describing the viney species' worm-like twining habit.

The species name pubescens comes from the Latin word pubens meaning "with downy hair."

== Taxonomy ==
Ipomoea pubescens was first published by Jean-Baptiste Lamarck in 1793 in the book Tableau encyclopedique et methodique des trois règnes de la nature: Botanique. In scientific works this first description usually cited as Tabl. Encycl. 1: 465.

Ipomoea pubescens belongs to a clade that includes the similar Ipomoea hederacea, Ipomoea purpurea, Ipomoea nil and Ipomoea indica. The sister species of Ipomoea pubescens appears to be I. purpurea.

The species' leaves are highly variable in size and structure, probably a reason for its having gathered so many synonyms during its history.

=== Synonyms ===
In 2025, these 25 synonyms were recognized for Ipomoea pubescens:

- Convolvulus pubescens (Lam.) Willd. (1809)
- Pharbitis pubescens (Lam.) Choisy (1845)
- Aniseia heterophylla (Ortega) Meisn (1869)
- Batatas heterophylla (Ortega) G.Don (1837)
- Batatas papiru (Ruiz & Pav.) G.Don (1837)
- Batatas subtriloba (Ruiz & Pav.) G.Don (1837)
- Batatas willdenowii G.Don. (1837)
- Convolvuloides pilosa Moench (1794)
- Convolvulus heterophyllus (Ortega) spreng. (1824)
- Convolvulus papiru (Ruiz & Pav.) Spreng. (1824)
- Convolvulus paspiria | Spreng. (1824)
- Ipomoea bulbocastana Moc. & Sessé ex Choisy (1845)
- Ipomoea heterophylla Ortega (1797)
- Ipomoea heterophylla var. subcomosa House (1908)
- Ipomoea hirsuta Schrank (1822)
- Ipomoea lindheimeri var. subintegra House (1908)
- Ipomoea martiusiana Steud. (1840)
- Ipomoea ortegae Poir. (1816)
- Ipomoea papiru Ruiz & Pav. (1799)
- Ipomoea papiru var. subtriloba (Ruiz & Pav.) Pers. (1805)
- Ipomoea subtriloba Ruiz & Pav. (1799)
- Ipomoea varia Roth (1800)
- Ipomoea willdenowii Roem. & Schult. (1819)
- Pharbitis heterophylla (Ortega) Choisy (1845)
- Pharbitis varia (Roth) G.Don (1837)
