= Ivy-leaf morning glory =

Ivy-leaf morning glory is a common name for several plants and may refer to:

- Ipomoea hederacea
- Ipomoea hederifolia, native to the Americas

== See also ==
- Ipomoea nil, ivy morning glory
