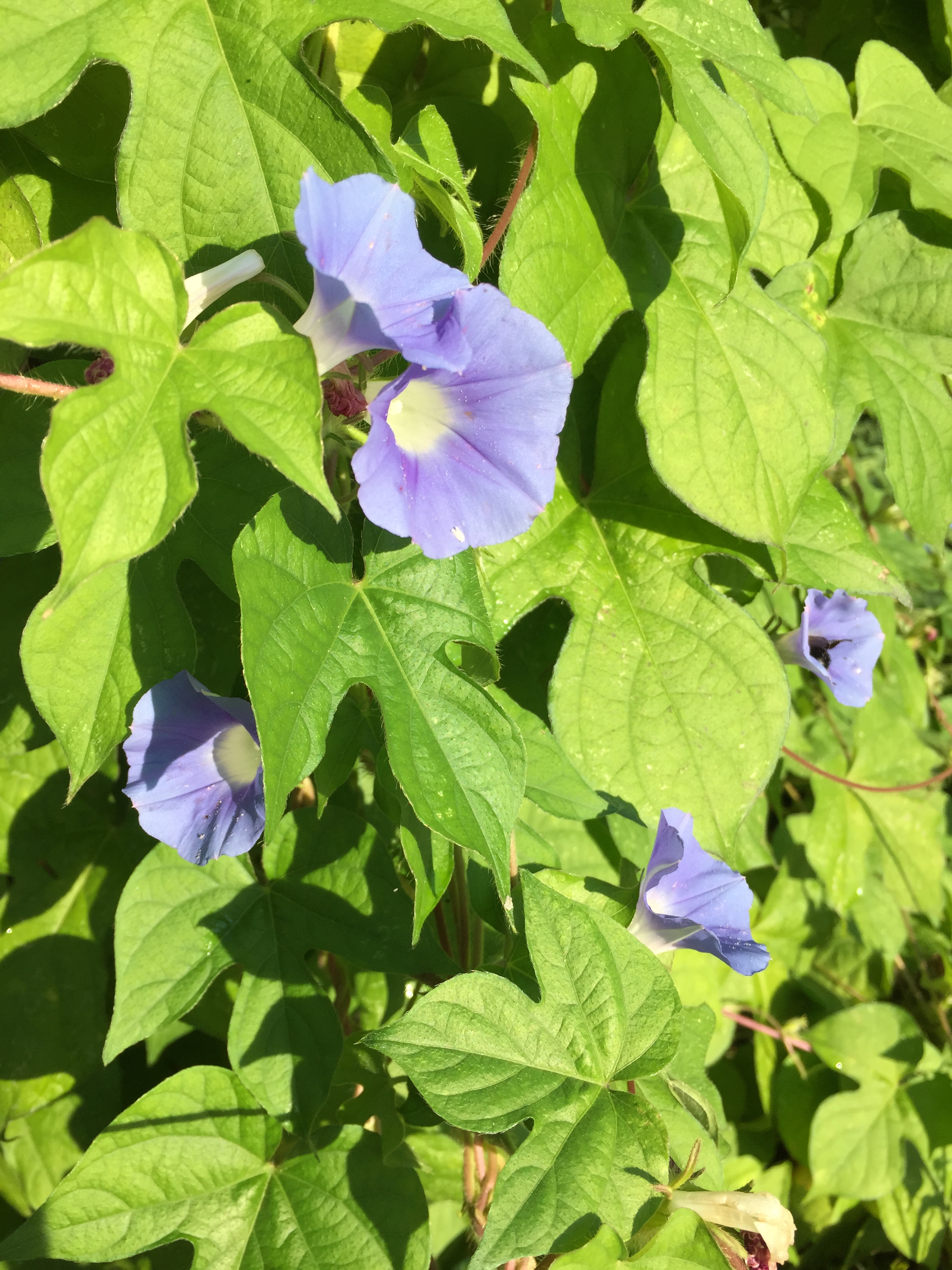

Conservation status
- Secure (NatureServe)

Scientific classification
- Kingdom: Plantae
- Clade: Tracheophytes
- Clade: Angiosperms
- Clade: Eudicots
- Clade: Asterids
- Order: Solanales
- Family: Convolvulaceae
- Genus: Ipomoea
- Species: I. hederacea

Binomial name
- Ipomoea hederacea Jacq.

= Ipomoea hederacea =

Ivy-leaved morning glory

Species of flowering plant

Ipomoea hederacea, the ivy-leaved morning glory or Kaladana, is a flowering plant in the bindweed family. The species is native to tropical parts of the Americas, and has more recently been introduced to North America. It now occurs there from Arizona to Florida and north to Ontario and North Dakota. Like most members of the family, it is a climbing vine with alternate leaves on twining stems. The flowers are blue to rose-purple with a white inner throat and emerge in summer and continue until late fall. The leaves are typically three-lobed, but sometimes may be five-lobed or entire. Flowers occur in clusters of one to three and are 2.5–4.5 cm long and wide. The sepals taper to long, recurved tips and measure 12–24 mm long. The species shares some features with the close relative Ipomoea purpurea, and is almost identical in appearance to wild forms of I. nil.

== Ecology ==
The morning glories are little used by white-tailed deer. The large seeds are taken infrequently by northern bobwhite and seed-eating songbirds. Flowers are used by some of the larger butterflies such as swallowtails and fritillaries and the ruby-throated hummingbird.

Most of the pollinations of Ipomoea hederacea are achieved by self-pollination, with a selfing rate of 93% observed in one population.

Ipomoea hederacea has been studied as a target of character displacement. When it co-occurs with Ipomoea purpurea, natural selection favors individuals of I. hederacea with anthers that are more tightly clustered around the stigma. This is to presumably reduce pollinations of I. hederacea by I. purpurea, which, should they occur, results in sterile seeds, wasting valuable resources of the parent plant and reducing fitness. This fitness reduction is not reciprocal, however, as I. hederacea pollen does not germinate on I. purpurea stigmas, thus giving the latter species a potential advantage competitively. This selective pressure leads the anthers to form a barrier over the stigma of I. hederacea to protect from pollen from other species making contact, but possibly increasing self-pollination, as well. When I. hederacea occurs by itself, however, no such selective pressure is evident and anther barriers are looser and less consistent.

== Alkaloids ==
The seeds of the plant have been mentioned to contain up to 0.5% of lysergol, an ergoline alkaloid also found in other Ipomoea and fungi from the Claviceps genus. Patents filed by the company Farmex describe the use of this plant for the production of such alakaloids, even though the industrial relevancy of these processes is questionable when compared to other means of production.
