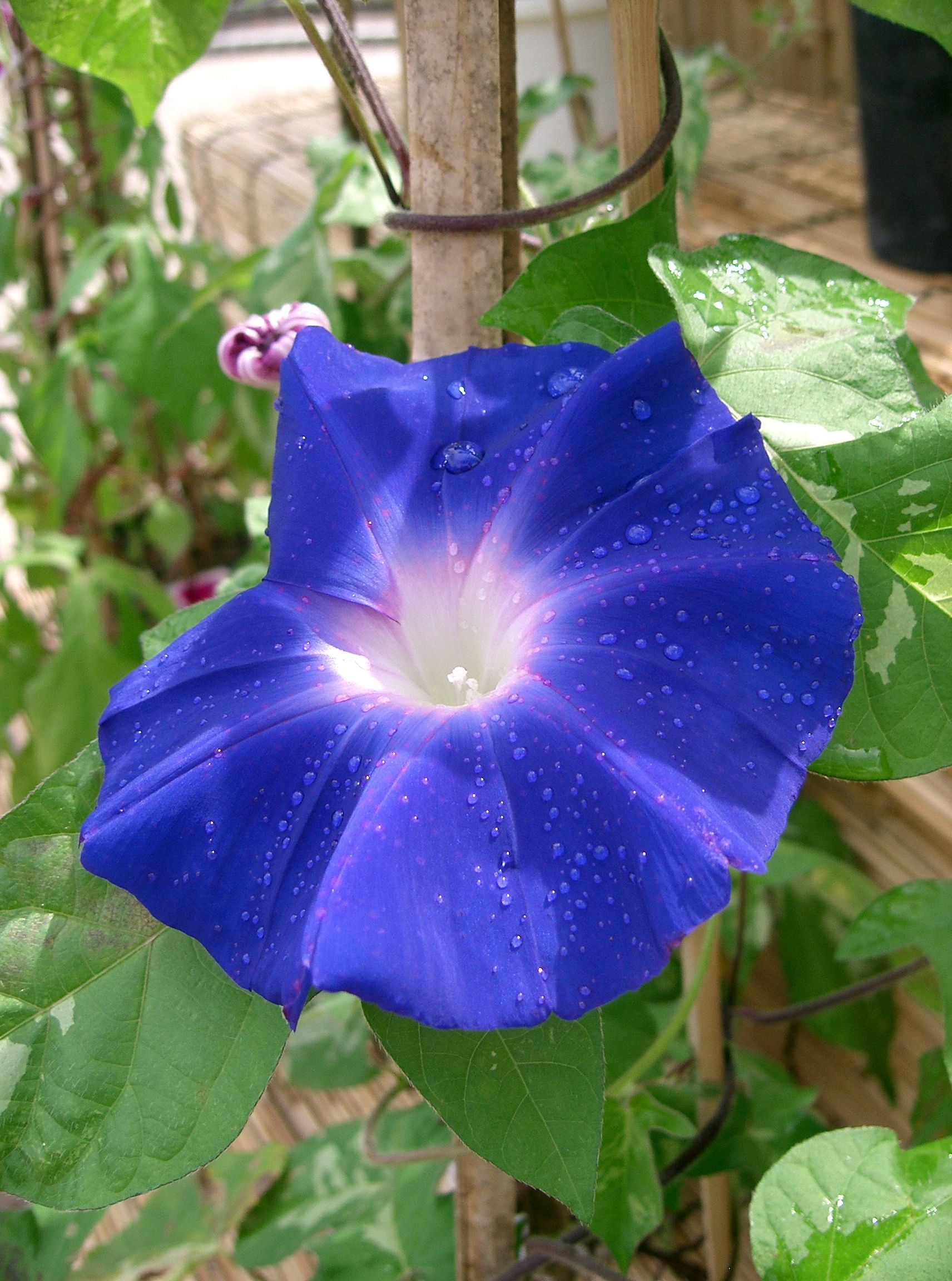

Scientific classification
- Kingdom: Plantae
- Clade: Embryophytes
- Clade: Tracheophytes
- Clade: Spermatophytes
- Clade: Angiosperms
- Clade: Eudicots
- Clade: Asterids
- Order: Solanales
- Family: Convolvulaceae
- Genus: Ipomoea
- Species: I. nil

Binomial name
- Ipomoea nil (L.) Roth

Synonyms
- Convolvulus nil L.; Convolvulus hederaceus L.; Ipomoea githaginea Hochst. ex A.Rich.; Ipomoea scabra Forssk.; Pharbitis nil (L.) Choisy

= Ipomoea nil =

Species of vine

Ipomoea nil is a species of Ipomoea morning glory known by several common names, including picotee morning glory, ivy morning glory, ivy-leaf morning glory, and Japanese morning glory (although it is not native to Japan). It is native to the tropical Americas, and has been introduced widely across the world.

== Description ==
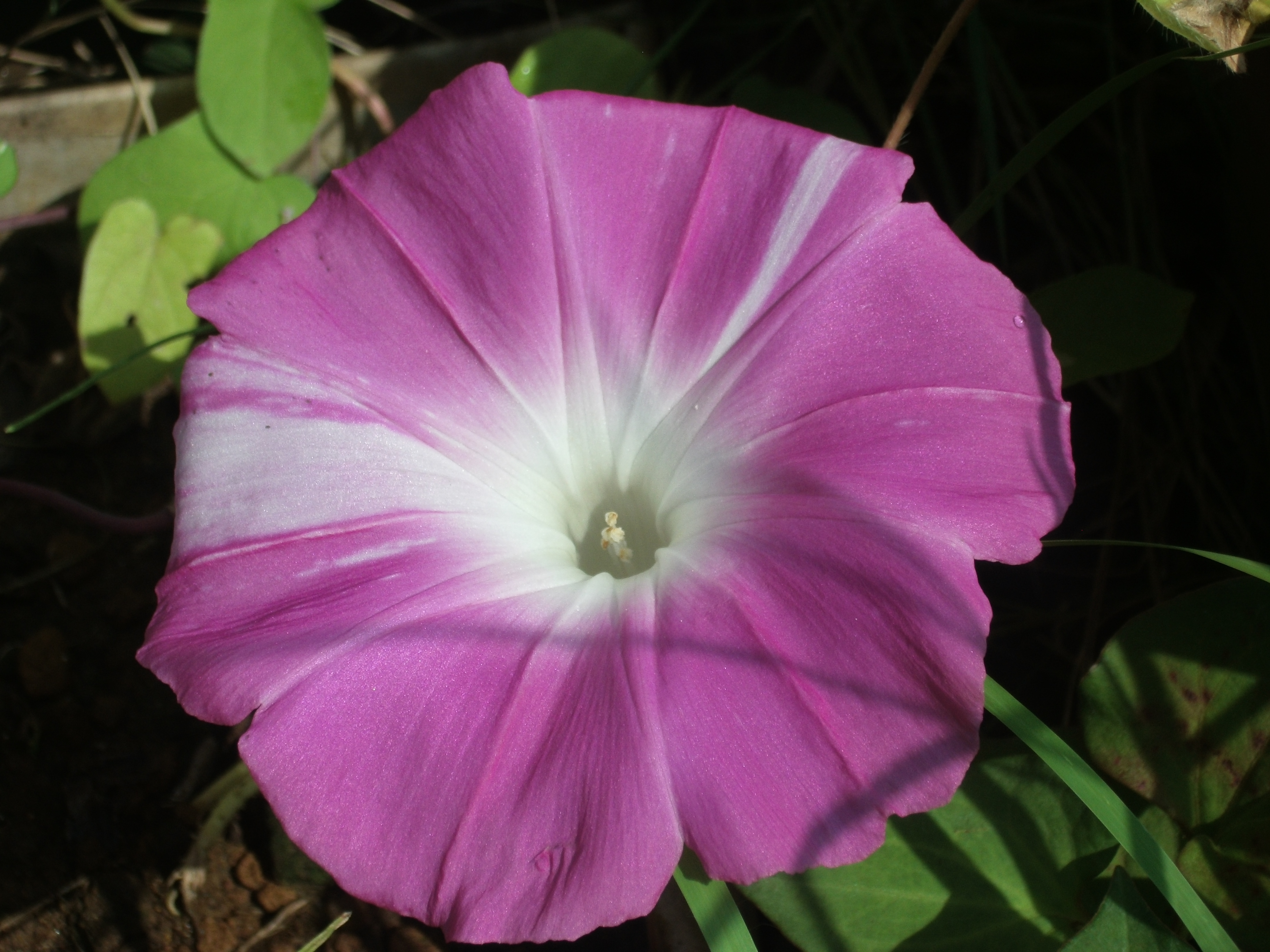
Cultivated flower close-up

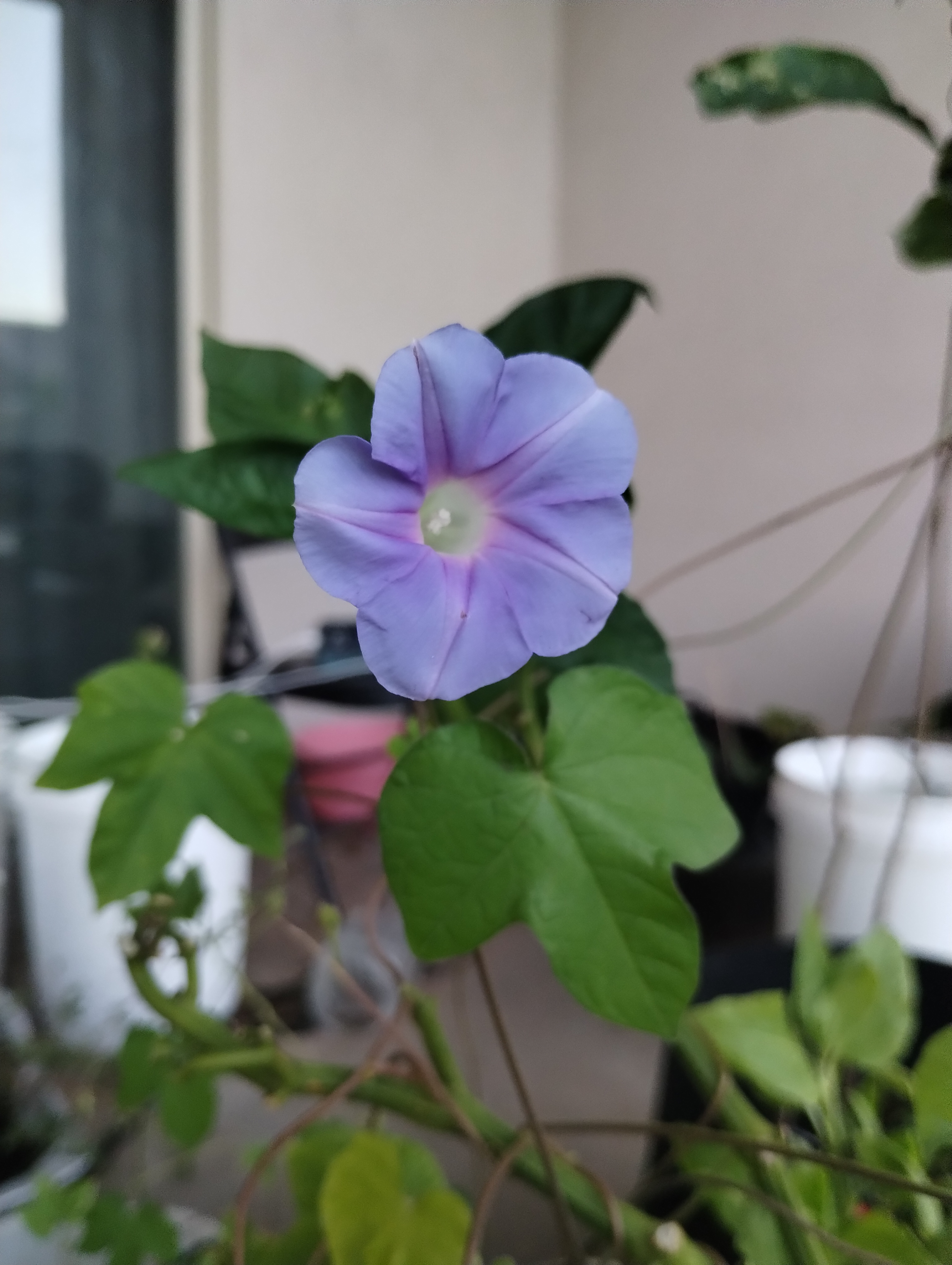
Wild form

Native to Central America and Mexico, the plant is a climber with twining stems up to 5 m long and is dense to scattered with long hairy trichomes. The finely hairy, emerald green leaves are ovate to almost circular, 5 to 14 cm long. The base is heart-shaped, the edge is entire or lobed three to five times, the leaf lobes are pointed or tapering. The species, especially its wild form, is extremely similar to Ipomoea hederacea.

The funnel-shaped, colorful flowers (blue to reddish-purple, with whitish tube) are quite showy and are individually up to five in often dense cymose groups, in which fully developed flowers and developing buds stand together. The wild forms are smaller than cultivated forms, and are almost always blue; the cultivated forms come in a wide variety of colors. They open in the morning and close by the afternoon. The long, thorny hairy sepals have a length of 15 to 25 mm, they are long, lanceolate, and have a linear-lanceolate tip. The crown is blue, purple, or almost scarlet red. The throat is often colored white. The crown tube has a length of 3 to 5 cm, the crown hem has a width of 4 to 5 cm.

The fruits are almost spherical to spherical capsule fruits with a diameter of 8 to 12 mm. The seeds are pear-shaped and densely covered with short trichomes.

== Cultivation ==
It is cultivated as an ornamental plant in many places, and the descendants of garden escapees now grow wild. Fast-growing and self-seeding, it may be used to hide unsightly fences or walls, and may also be used decoratively on trellises. The flowers are several centimeters wide and appear in various shades of blue, pink or rose, often with white stripes or edges or blends of colors. Common cultivars include 'Scarlet O'Hara', 'Early Call', and 'Rose Silk'.

Hybrids, for instance with I. purpurea, have been developed. Some of these have been given the name I. x imperialis (Imperial Japanese morning glory), which is not official. Cultivars include 'Sunrise Serenade'. Alternative nomenclatures include Ipomoea nil x imperialis, as in 'Cameo Elegance', or Ipomoea nil 'Imperialis'. It is a frost tender annual in colder areas or if placed in shaded area in the garden, but can be kept as a perennial if it is well managed and placed in full sun during the winter.

== Morning glories in Japan ==
Morning glories are popular in Japan. They are believed to have been introduced there directly from China in the Heian period of the 8th to 9th centuries. During the Edo period of the 17th to 19th centuries, as more people started to live in cities, a fad for growing potted morning glories of different colors and sizes swept through the country. The pots are often equipped with cylindrical structures called andon shitate (Japanese: 行燈仕立て), which look like Japanese lanterns at night.

In early summer, morning glory markets are held in large cities in Japan, where merchants and hobbyists sell the flowers. The largest of such markets is the Iriya Morning Glory Market (Japanese: 入谷朝顔市, July 6–8), held along the roads surrounding Shingenji Temple, commonly called "Iriya Kishibojin", in Iriya, Taito-ku, Tokyo.

== Gallery ==
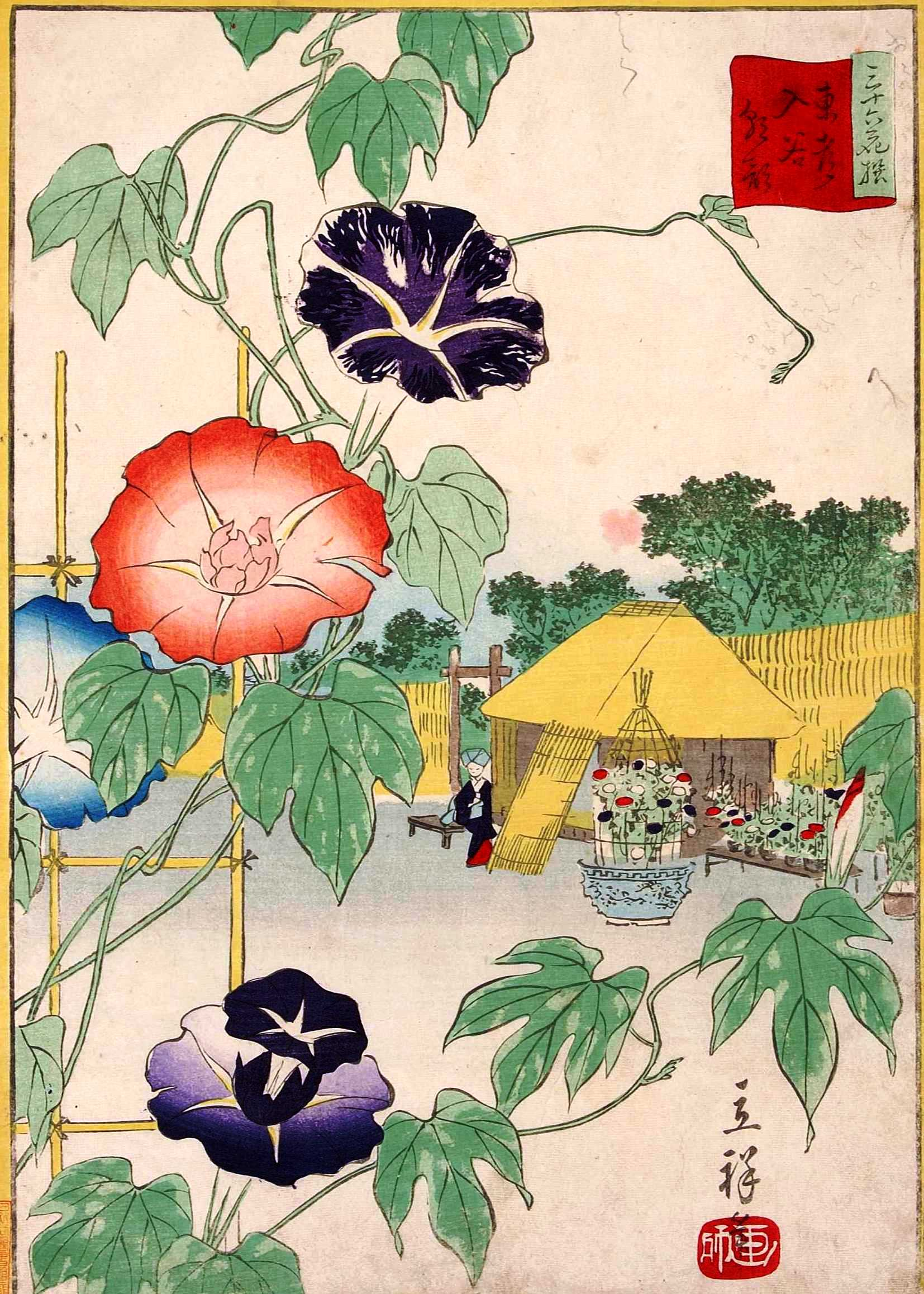
"Morning Glories in Iriya, Eastern Capital" (1866), No 28 of "The Thirty-six Selected Flower Scenes" by Hiroshige II

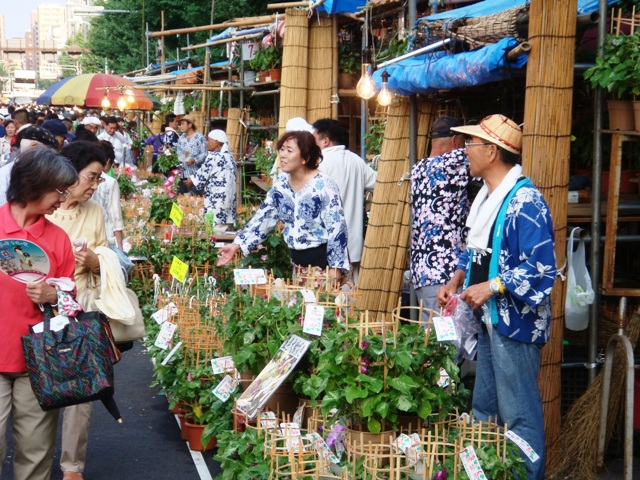
The Iriya Morning Glory Market, Tokyo (2008)

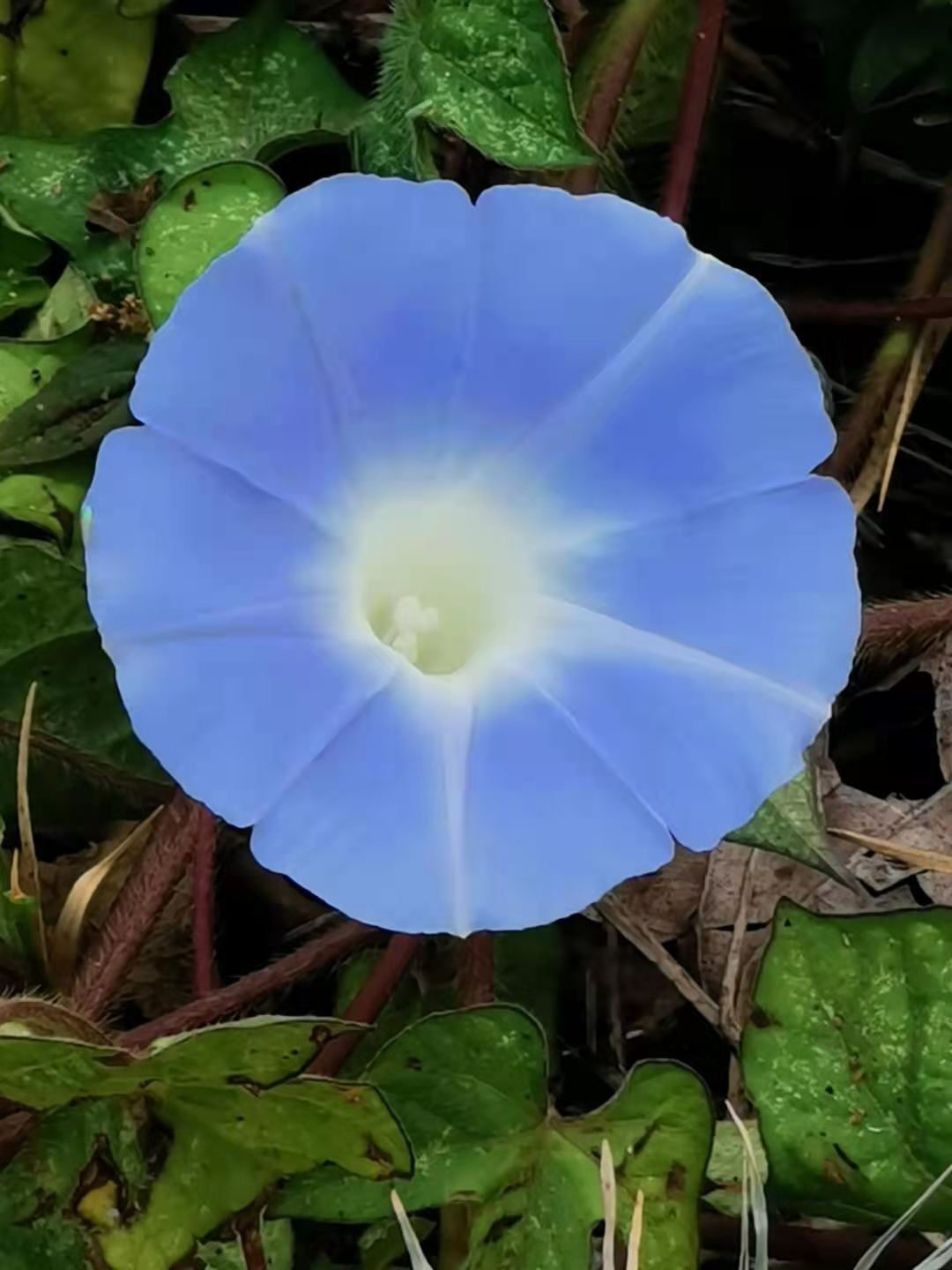
Growing in the wild

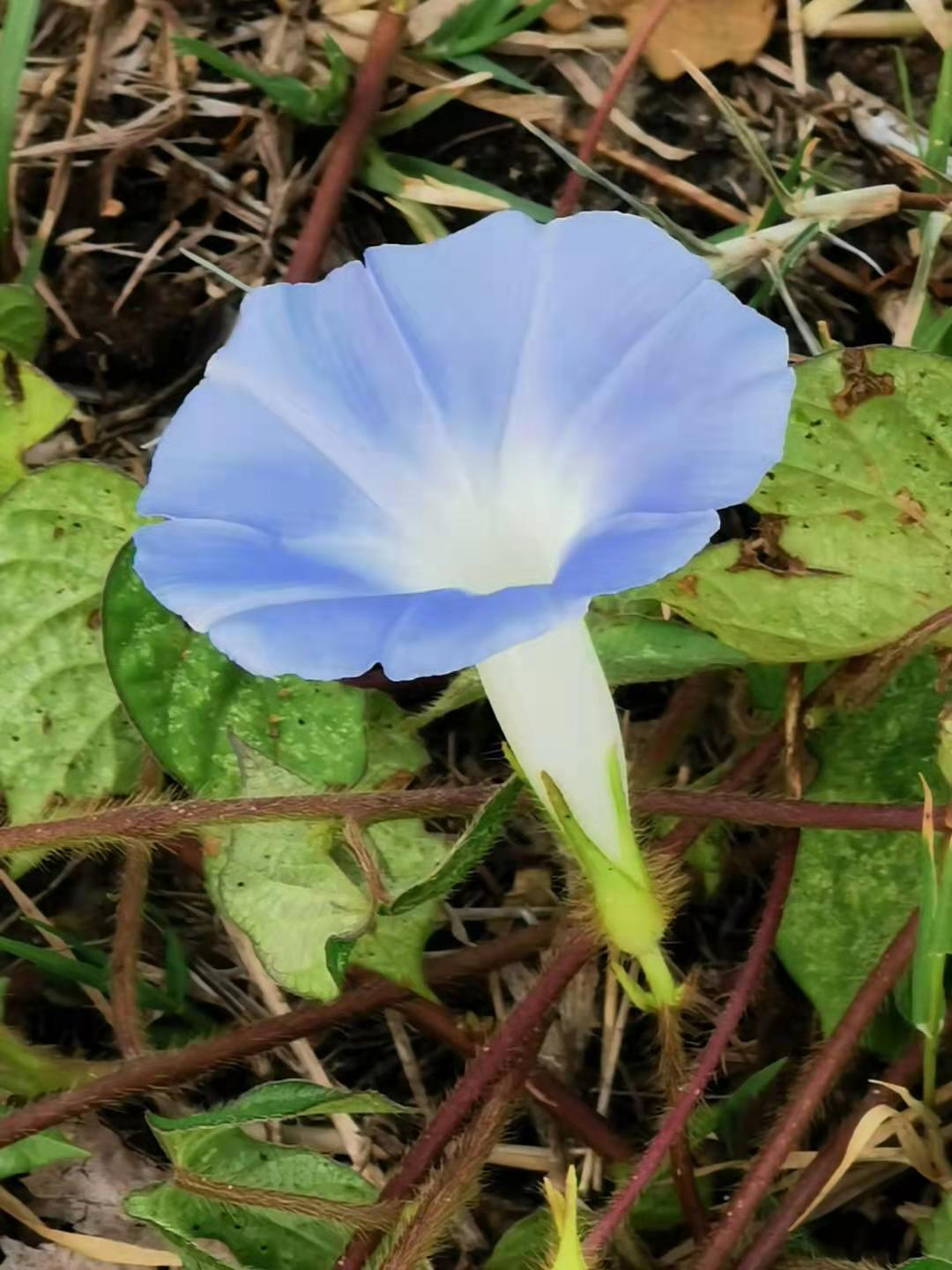
Growing in the wild

== See also ==
- Morning glory
