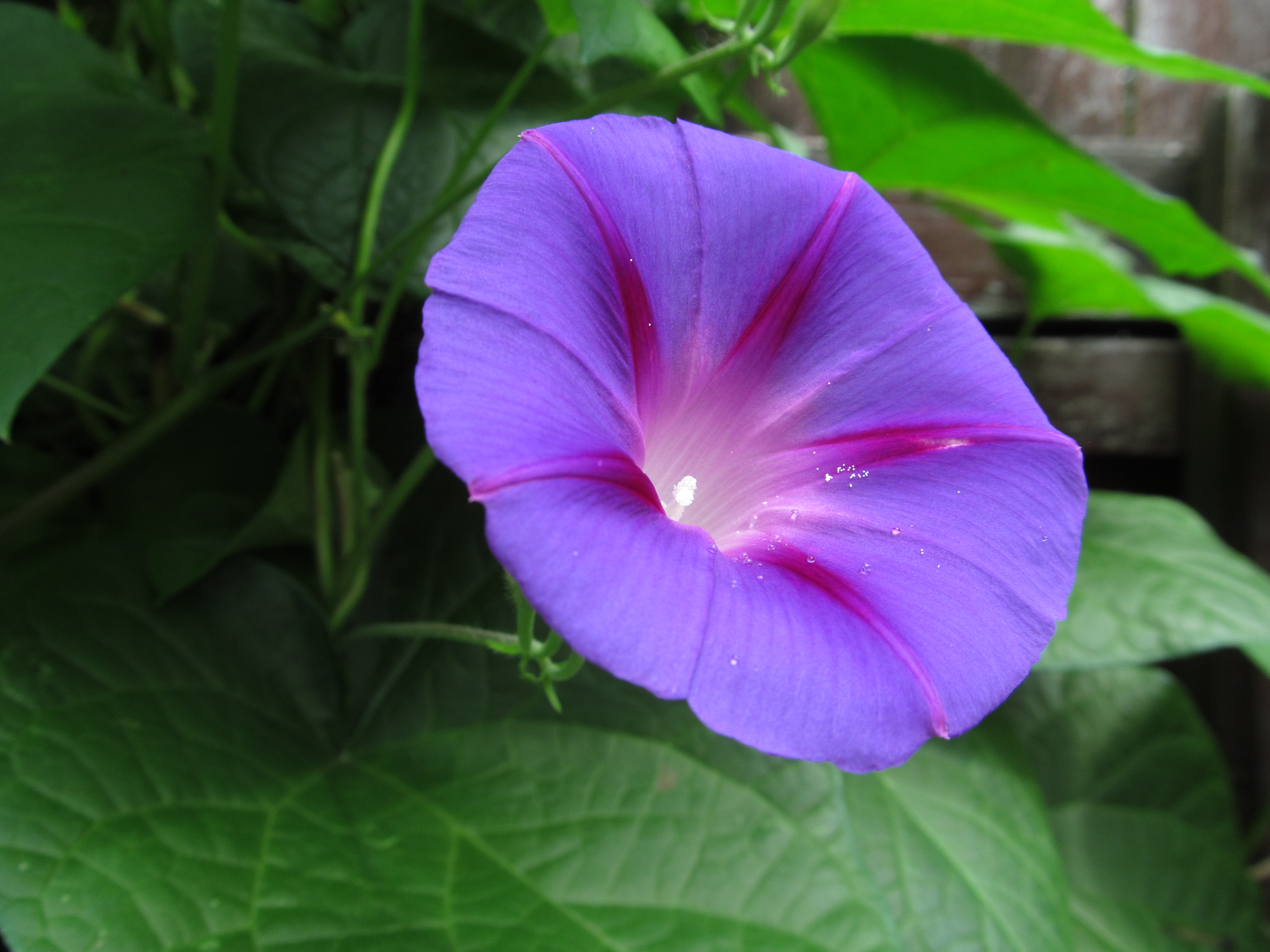

Scientific classification
- Kingdom: Plantae
- Clade: Tracheophytes
- Clade: Angiosperms
- Clade: Eudicots
- Clade: Asterids
- Order: Solanales
- Family: Convolvulaceae
- Genus: Ipomoea
- Species: I. purpurea

Binomial name
- Ipomoea purpurea (L.) Roth

= Ipomoea purpurea =

Species of plant

Ipomoea purpurea, the common morning-glory, tall morning-glory, or purple morning glory, is a species in the genus Ipomoea.

It is native to Mexico and Central America, and is naturalized throughout warm temperate and subtropical regions of the world.

== Description ==
Like all morning glories, the plant entwines itself around structures, growing to a height of 2–3 m (6 ft 7 in – 9 ft 10 in) tall. The leaves are heart-shaped and the stems are covered with brown hairs. The flowers are trumpet-shaped, predominantly blue to purple or white, and 3–6 cm (1.2–2.4 in) in diameter.

== Distribution and habitat ==
The plant is predisposed to moist and rich soil, but can be found growing in a wide array of soil types.

Although it is often considered a noxious weed in most parts of the world where it has grown invasively, I. purpurea is also grown for its attractive purple and white flowers, and has many cultivars. Common cultivars include I. purpurea 'Crimson Rambler' (red-violet blossoms with white throats), 'Grandpa Ott's', 'Kniola's Black Knight', 'Star of Yelta' (blossoms in varying shades of deep purple with white or pale pink throats), and 'Milky Way' (white corolla with mauve accents).

== Chemistry ==
=== Ergoline alkaloids ===
Though some studies have reported the presence of ergoline alkaloids in I. purpurea other studies with more rigorous taxonomic identification of plant material have failed to reproduce such findings and attribute such discrepancies to failure to properly differentiate plant material at a species level.

=== Flower color ===
Acylated cyanidin glycosides can be isolated from violet-blue flowers of I. purpurea. These anthocyanins were all based on cyanidin 3-sophoroside-5-glucoside, acylated with caffeic acid and/or p-coumaric acid.

Acylated pelargonidin glycosides can be isolated from the red-purple flowers of I. purpurea. The acylated anthocyanins were all based on pelargonidin 3-sophoroside-5-glucoside, acylated with caffeic acid and/or glucosylcaffeic acid.

== Gallery ==
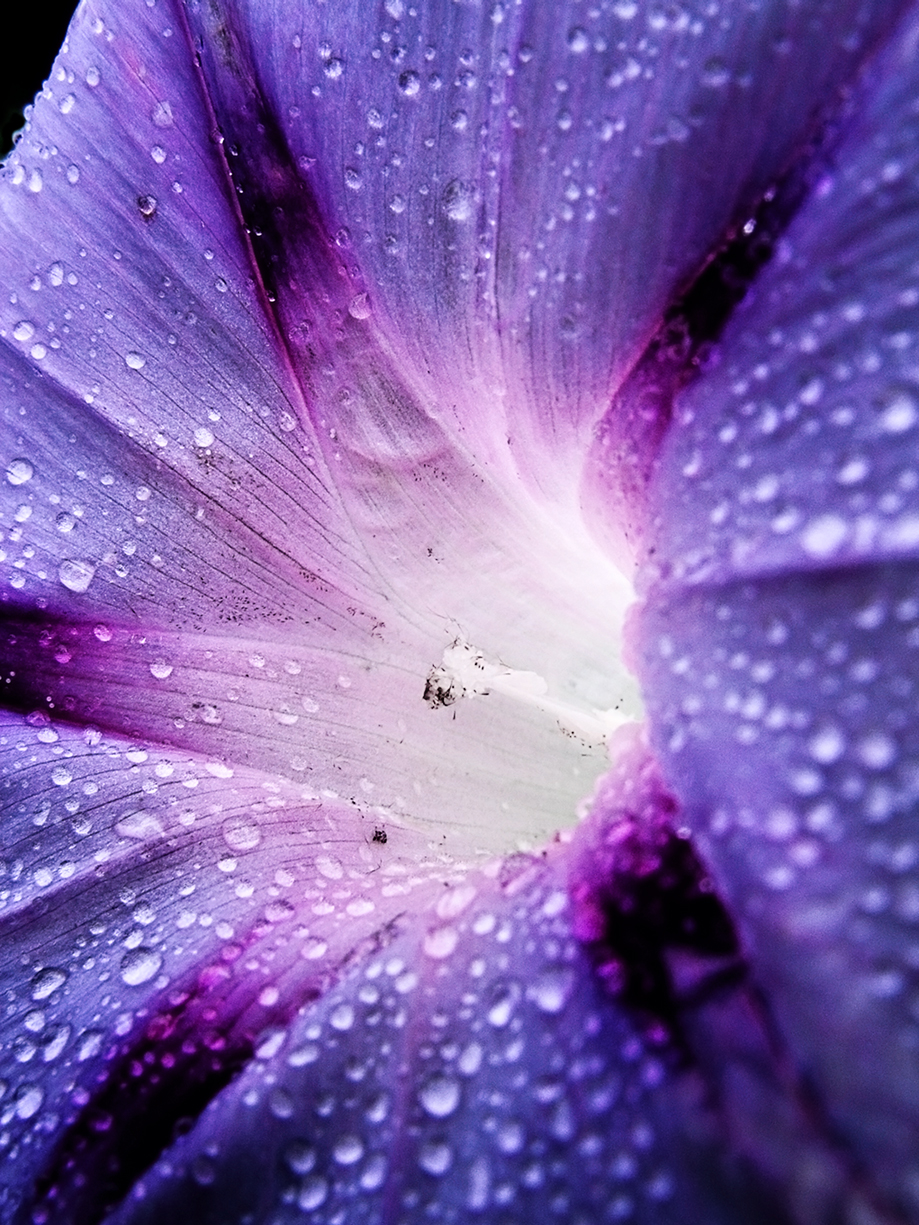
Light blue I. purpurea

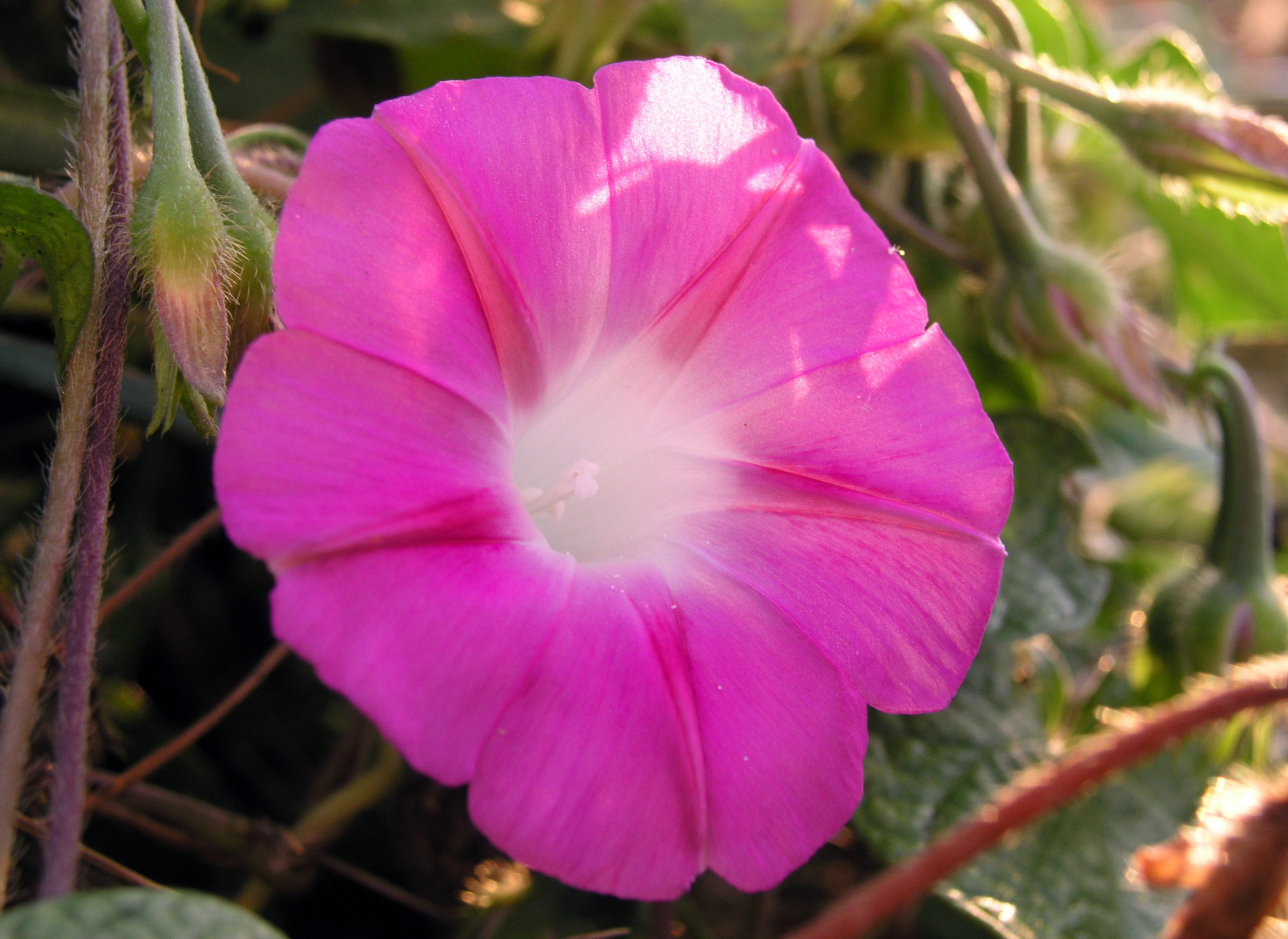
Pink I. purpurea

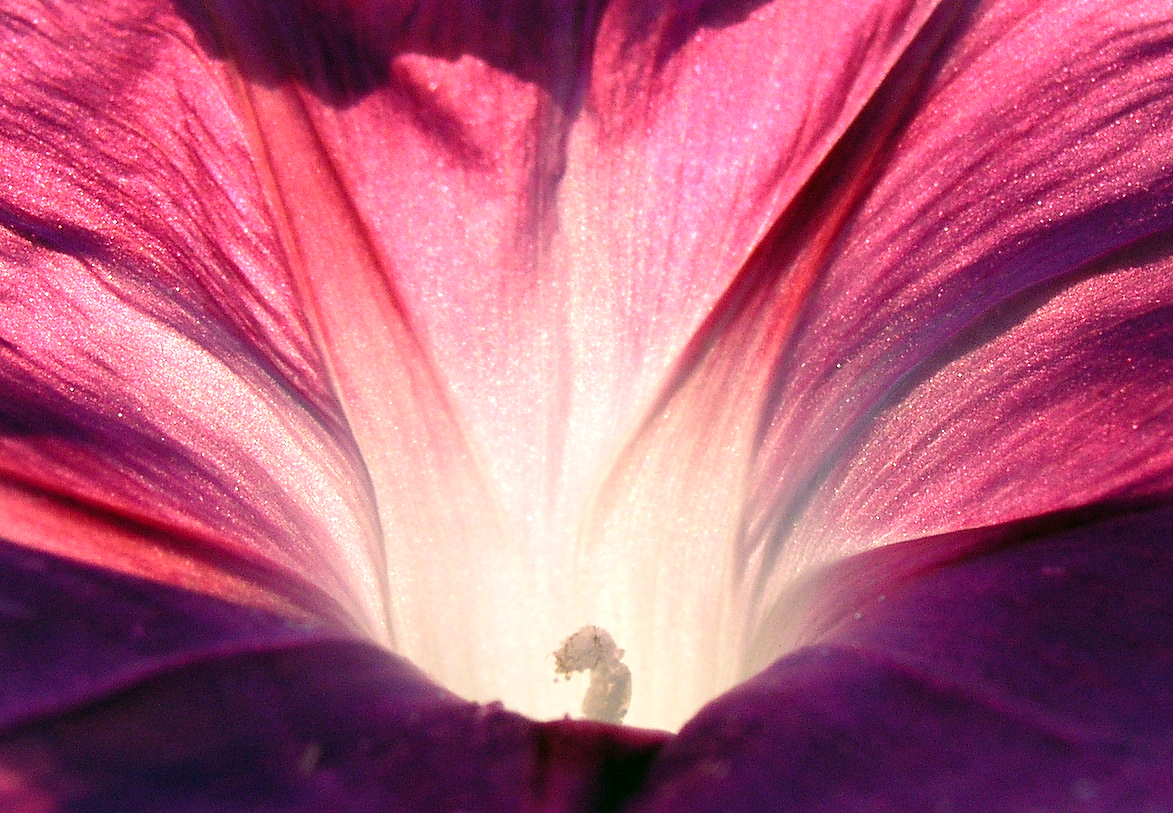
Pink I. purpurea close-up

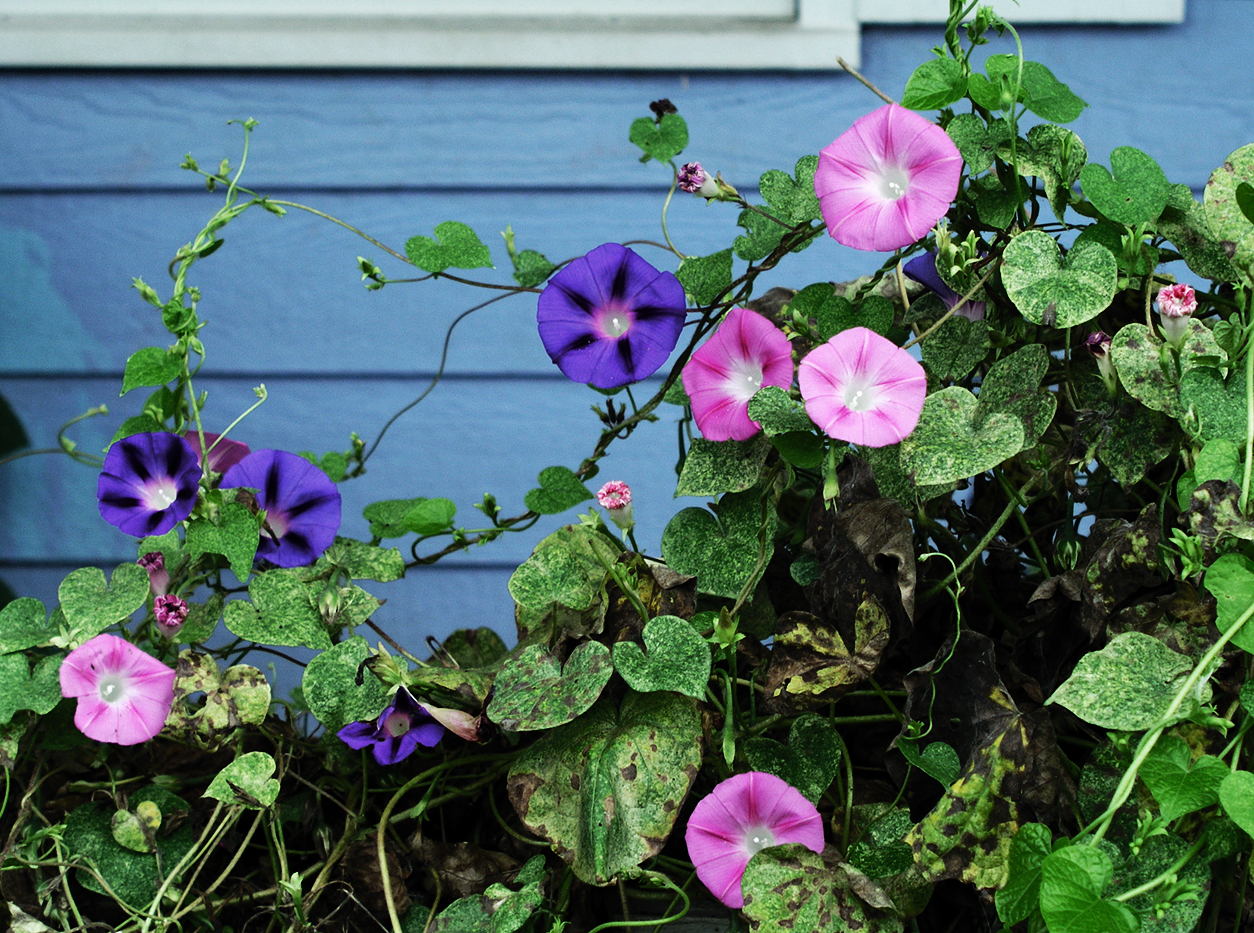
I. purpurea in Loganville, Georgia

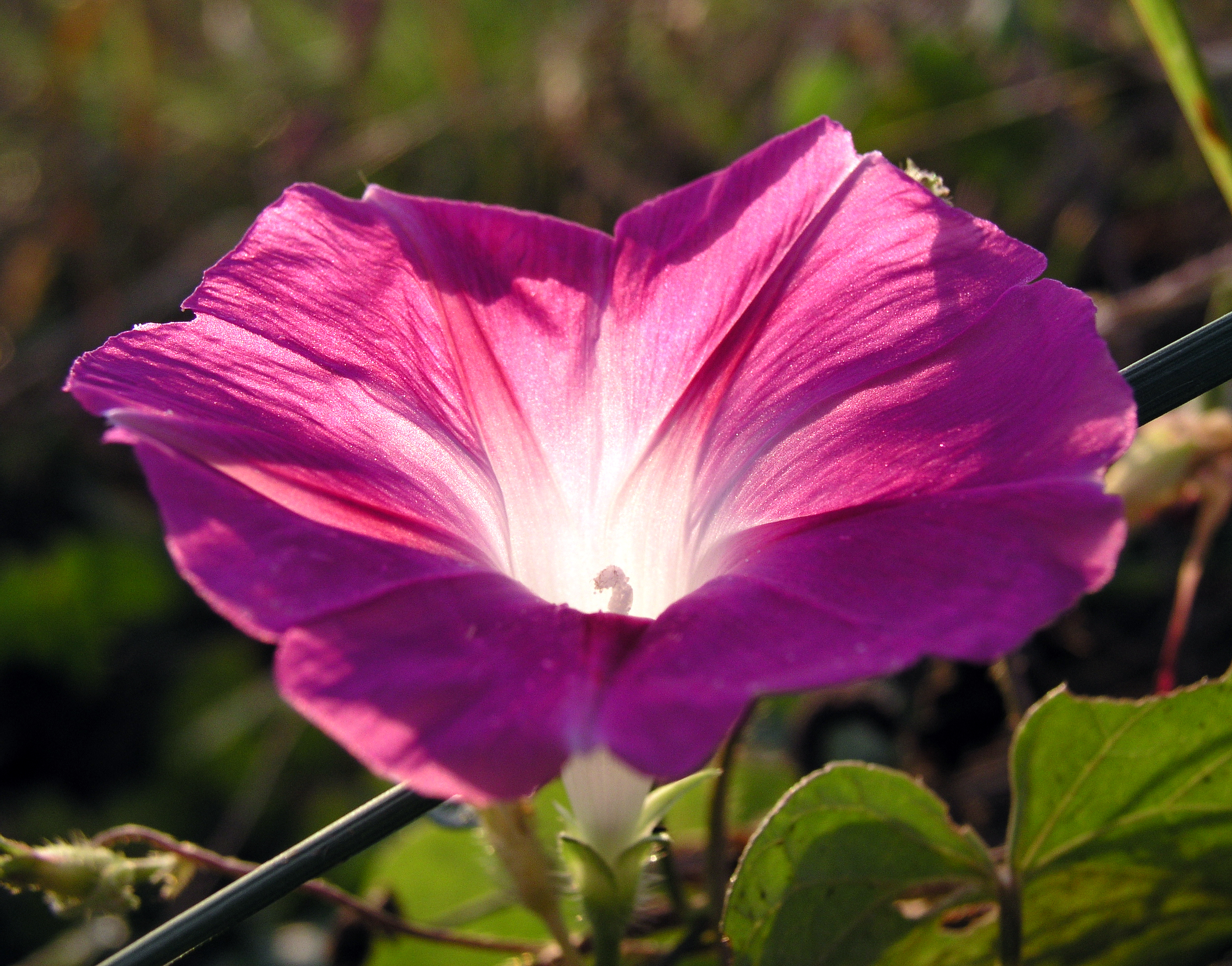
Pink I. purpurea

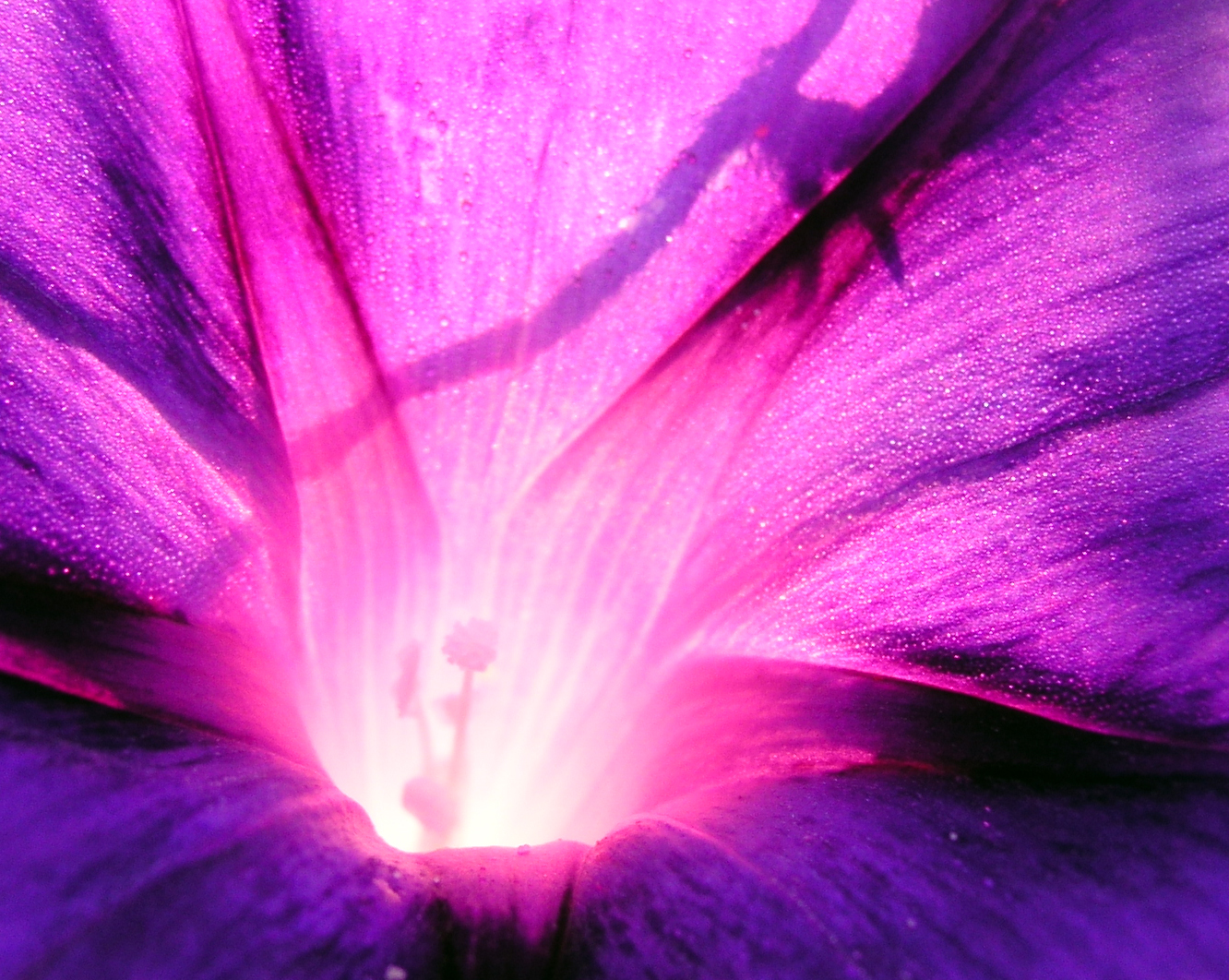
Purple I. purpurea close-up

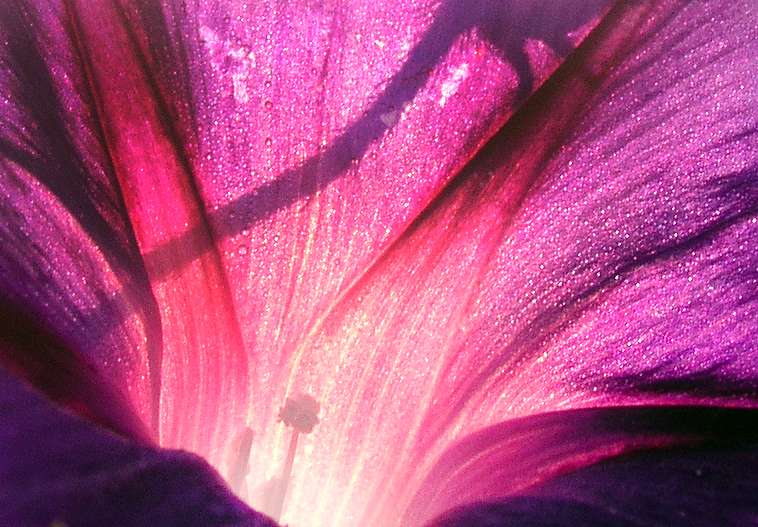
Purple I. purpurea close-up

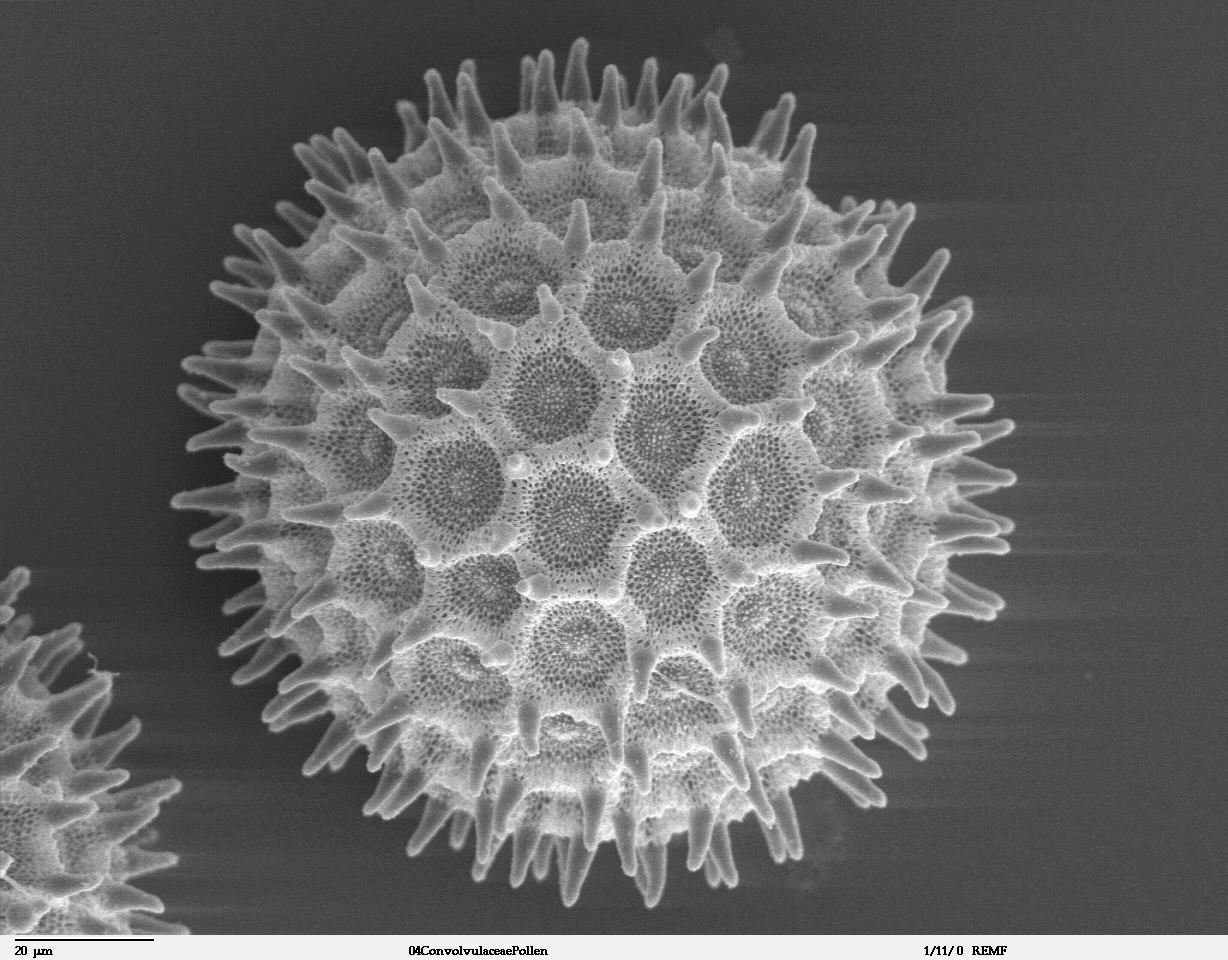
Scanning electron micrograph of I. purpurea pollen

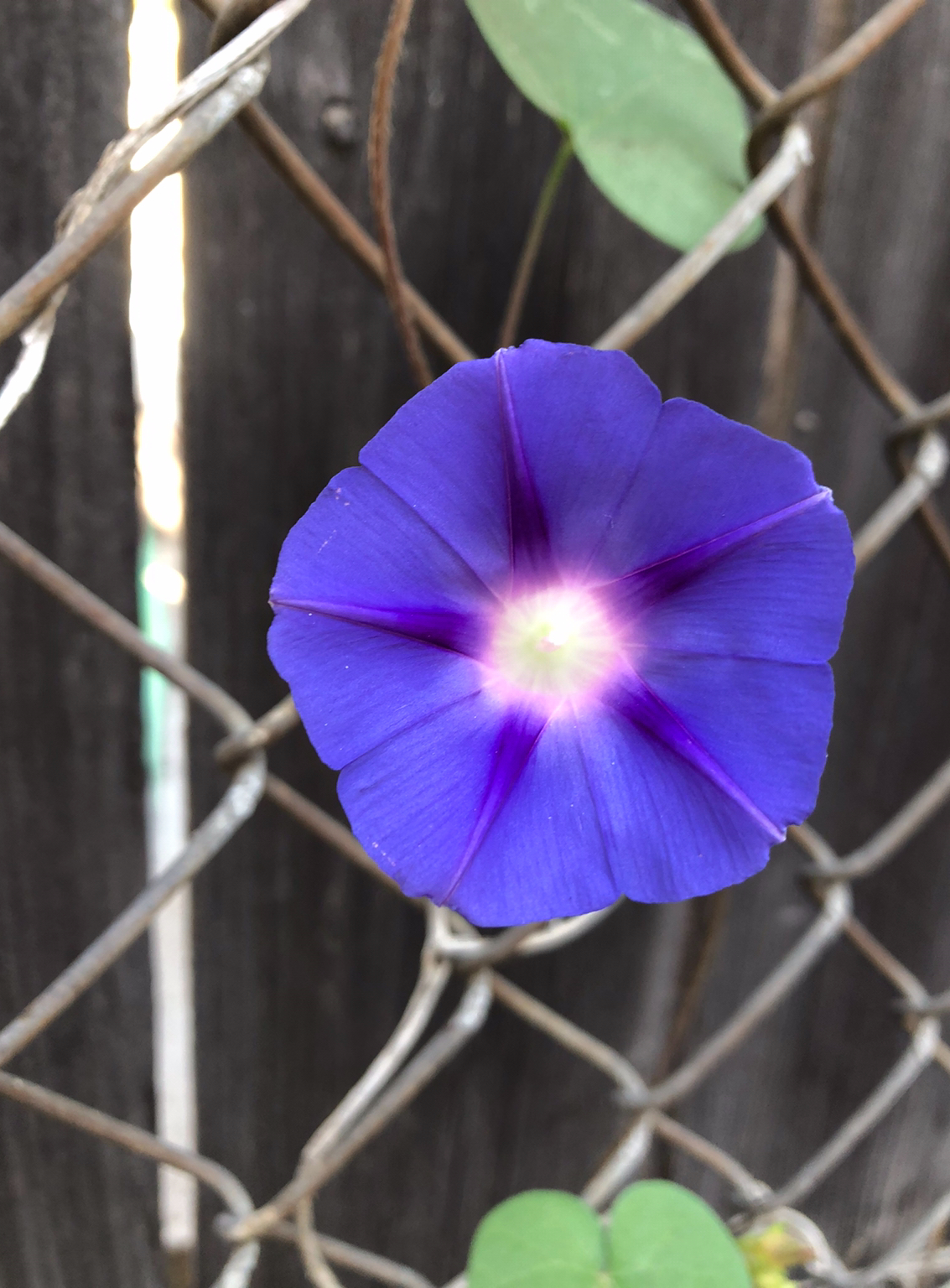
Violet-blue I. purpurea

== See also ==
- Morning glory
