= Hildebrandtia =

Hildebrandtia may refer to:

- Hildebrandtia (frog), a genus of frogs
- Hildebrandtia (plant), a genus of bindweeds
