= Maripa =

Maripa may refer to:

- Maripa, Venezuela
- Maripa (grasshopper), a genus of grasshoppers in the family Eumastacidae
- Maripa (plant), a genus of plants in the family Convolvulaceae
- The Maripa palm, (Attalea maripa)

or to:

- Maripá, Paraná, Brazil
- Maripá de Minas, Minas Gerais, Brazil
