= Elmer Drew Merrill =

American botanist (1876–1956)

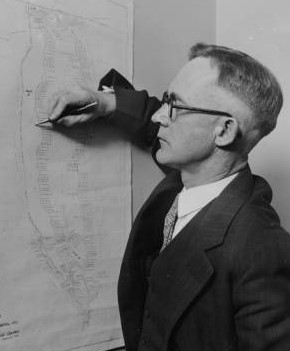
- Elmer Drew Merrill examines map of California Botanic Gardens
- Born: October 15, 1876; Auburn, Maine, U.S.
- Died: February 25, 1956 (aged 79); Forest Hills, Massachusetts, U.S.
- Known for: study of the flora of the Asia-Pacific region
- Scientific career
- Institutions: University of the Philippines (1908–1924); University of California, Berkeley (1924–1926); Columbia University (1929–1931); Harvard University (1935–1956)
- Doctoral students: Shiu-Ying Hu
- Author abbrev. (botany): Merr.

Elmer Drew Merrill (October 15, 1876 – February 25, 1956) was an American botanist and taxonomist. He spent more than twenty years in the Philippines where he became a recognized authority on the flora of the Asia-Pacific region. Through the course of his career he authored nearly 500 publications, described approximately 3,000 new plant species, and amassed over one million herbarium specimens. In addition to his scientific work he was an accomplished administrator, college dean, university professor and editor of scientific journals.

== Early life ==
Merrill and his twin brother, Dana, were born and raised in East Auburn, Maine, the youngest of six children born to Daniel C. and Mary (Noyes) Merrill. Merrill showed an early interest in natural history, collecting and identifying plants, birds' eggs, rocks, and minerals. In 1894 he entered the University of Maine with the intention of studying engineering but soon switched to a general science curriculum where he focused on the biology and classification of flowering plants. He was the valedictorian of his graduation class in 1898 and then stayed on for an additional year working as an assistant in the Department of Natural Science. During his time in college Merrill built a sizable herbarium of almost 2,000 specimens which he eventually donated to the New England Botanical Club.

In 1899 Merrill accepted a position with the United States Department of Agriculture in Washington D.C. as an assistant to Frank Lamson-Scribner, an authority on the classification of grasses and a pioneer plant pathologist. At the USDA he learned the principles of plant taxonomy and became proficient in the development and management of a herbarium. His training was supplemented by fieldwork in Idaho, Montana, and Wyoming.

== Philippines ==
At the end of the Spanish–American War, the United States Taft Commission established the Insular Bureau of Agriculture in Manila. Merrill was appointed to the post of botanist in the new organization and arrived in 1902 in Manila where he was to work for the next twenty-two years. Merrill was dismayed to discover that the herbarium he was expecting to find had been destroyed during the war, along with the botanical library and scientific equipment. Nevertheless, starting with just an empty building, he set out to rebuild the herbarium and library.

Within a few months his role was expanded to include a joint appointment with the Bureau of Forestry. Over the years Merrill's responsibilities continued to grow until he became both the Director of the Bureau of Sciences and a Professor of Botany at the University of the Philippines. He collected and studied plants not only from the Philippines but also from the greater Asia-Pacific region including Indonesia, Malaysia, Indochina, China, and Guam. Eventually the herbarium grew to over 250,000 specimens and the botanical library was recognized as one of the best in Asia. At that time he edited three exsiccata series, the largest with 1200 numbered units under the title Plantae Insularum Philippinensium. Another large series was devoted to plants described by Manuel Blanco Ramos and Antonio Llanos Aller. Together with Charles Budd Robinson he worked on the legacy of Georg Eberhard Rumphius and the interpretation of his Herbarium Amboinense.

Merrill published more than 100 taxonomic papers on Philippine flora and several additional papers on the flora of the region. Many of his papers were published in The Philippine Journal of Science, a journal he helped establish and edited from 1907 to 1918. In 1912, he published a 500-page Flora of Manila covering some 1,000 species. In 1921, he completed a Bibliographic Enumeration of Bornean Plants, a volume of 637 pages. His most ambitious work was the Enumeration of Philippine Flowering Plants published in sections between 1923 and 1926. As documented by his Enumeration the list of known Philippine species had been extended from 2,500 plants of all types in 1900 to 8,120 species of flowering plants, 1,000 species of ferns, and 3,000 species of cryptogams.

== University of California, Berkeley ==
In 1924 Merrill returned to the United States to join the University of California, Berkeley. There he was appointed Dean of the College of Agriculture and Director of the Agricultural Experiment Station. At Berkeley he led a reorganization of the faculty, revised the curriculum, emphasized academic training of staff, added buildings and equipment, and stressed fundamental research. In 1925, Merrill established the journal Hilgardia, named for Eugene W. Hilgard who organized the Agriculture Department and was the founding director of the Agricultural Experiment Station. During his spare time, Merrill continued to work on systematic botany of the Asia-Pacific flora and added more than 100,000 specimens from that region to the university herbarium.

In 1926, a proposal was developed to establish the California Botanic Garden in Los Angeles. Merrill took part-time leave from the college to become director of the Garden Foundation. The plan involved the purchase of 4,500 acres (1,800 ha) at Mandeville Canyon in the Santa Monica Mountains. About 800 acres in the center of the tract were to be developed as a botanical garden financed by the sale of surrounding property for residential homes. During his short tenure as director Merrill built administrative offices and greenhouses, started a library, established an herbarium of 180,000 specimens and planted 1,200 species in the gardens. Unfortunately, not long after Merrill left, the plans collapsed when property prices plummeted as a result of the Great Depression. The herbarium was transferred to the University of California, Los Angeles and the gardens were subdivided and sold for housing.

== New York Botanic Garden ==
In 1929, Merrill accepted dual appointments as Director of the New York Botanic Garden and Professor of Botany at Columbia University. He started his new job at the onset of the Great Depression and the Garden was facing severe financial constraints. Despite these difficulties, he was able to continue many of the programs by taking advantage of personnel provided by the Works Progress Administration. Up to 300 personnel were employed building walks, roads, fences and other infrastructure in the gardens; or they worked in the herbarium as mounters, artists, secretaries, librarians, clerks and technicians.

The herbarium collection was completely rearranged, operations were improved, and specimens inventoried for the first time. Once the substantial backlog of unmounted material was complete, specimens were mounted for other institutions including the Arnold Arboretum and the Gray Herbarium. In 1931 Merrill established a new journal focused on systematic botany and plant geography, named Brittonia after Nathaniel Lord Britton, a co-founder of the Garden.

== Harvard University ==
In 1935, Merrill left the Botanic Garden and took a job as Administrator of Botanical Collections at Harvard University, a new position created to consolidate the supervision of eight separate Harvard botanical units. A year after his arrival Merrill also became the Arnold Professor of Botany, and in 1937 the Director of the Arnold Arboretum. In his new roles Merrill devoted significant time to expanding the herbarium of the Arnold Arboretum and to research on Asiatic plants. Over the next ten years 220,000 plant specimens were acquired from all parts of Asia and the Asia-Pacific. Meanwhile, Merrill continued to publish numerous papers on Asia flora as well as articles dealing with the cultivation and dispersion of domesticated plants. During the Second World War he consulted with the United States War Department and wrote a handbook, Emergency Food Plants and Poisonous Plants of the Islands of the Pacific.

In 1946, at the age of seventy Merrill retired from his administrative duties and became Professor Emeritus in 1948. He continued with his research at Harvard and traveled as much as his age and health would allow. One of his last major contributions was The Botany of Cook's Voyages and its Unexpected Significance in Relation to Anthropology, Biogeography and History, published in 1952.

Merrill died on February 25, 1956, in Forest Hills, Massachusetts, aged 79. His library of 2,600 titles was donated to the New York Botanical Garden and a fund was established to award an annual medal to "that individual within the entire field of botany irrespective of race, creed or nationality who was considered worthy of such an award".

== Recognition and honors ==
Merrill was widely recognized for his many accomplishments. He received honorary doctorate degrees from the University of Maine in 1926, Harvard University in 1936, the University of California in 1936, and Yale University in 1951. He was a Guggenheim Fellow for the academic year 1951–1952. At various times he served as President of the Botanical Society of America, Acting President of the American Association for the Advancement of Science, and President of the New England Botanical Club, the American Society of Plant Taxonomists, and the International Union of Biological Sciences. He was a member of the American Academy of Arts and Sciences, the United States National Academy of Sciences, and the American Philosophical Society.

Several plant genera; Merrillia (a synonym of Murraya J.Koenig ex L.), Merrillanthus (a synonym of Vincetoxicum Wolf), Merrilliobryum (a genus of moss), Merrilliodendron (the family Icacinaceae), Merrilliopanax (the family Araliaceae), Sinomerrillia (a synonym of Neuropeltis Wall.), and Elmerrillia (a synonym of Magnolia Plum. ex L.). Also over 200 species were named in his honour.

== Bibliography ==
A handful of his most notable publications are listed below. A more comprehensive bibliography is contained in Robbins' Biographical Memoir.

- A Flora of Manila. 1912
- An Interpretation of Rumphius's Herbarium Amboinense. 1917
- A Bibliographic Enumeration of Bornean Plants. 1921
- An Enumeration of Philippine Flowering Plants. 1923-26
- An Enumeration of Hainan Plants. 1927
- Polynesian Botanical Bibliography (1773-1935). 1937
- Emergency Food Plants and Poisonous Plants of the Islands of the Pacific. 1943
- A Botanical Bibliography of the Islands of the Pacific. 1946
- Botany of Cook's Voyages and Its Unexpected Significance in Relation to Anthropology, Biogeography and History. 1954

== See also ==
- Category:Taxa named by Elmer Drew Merrill
