= Zarivar Lake =

Lake in Iran

Lake Zarivār زریوار Zrewar
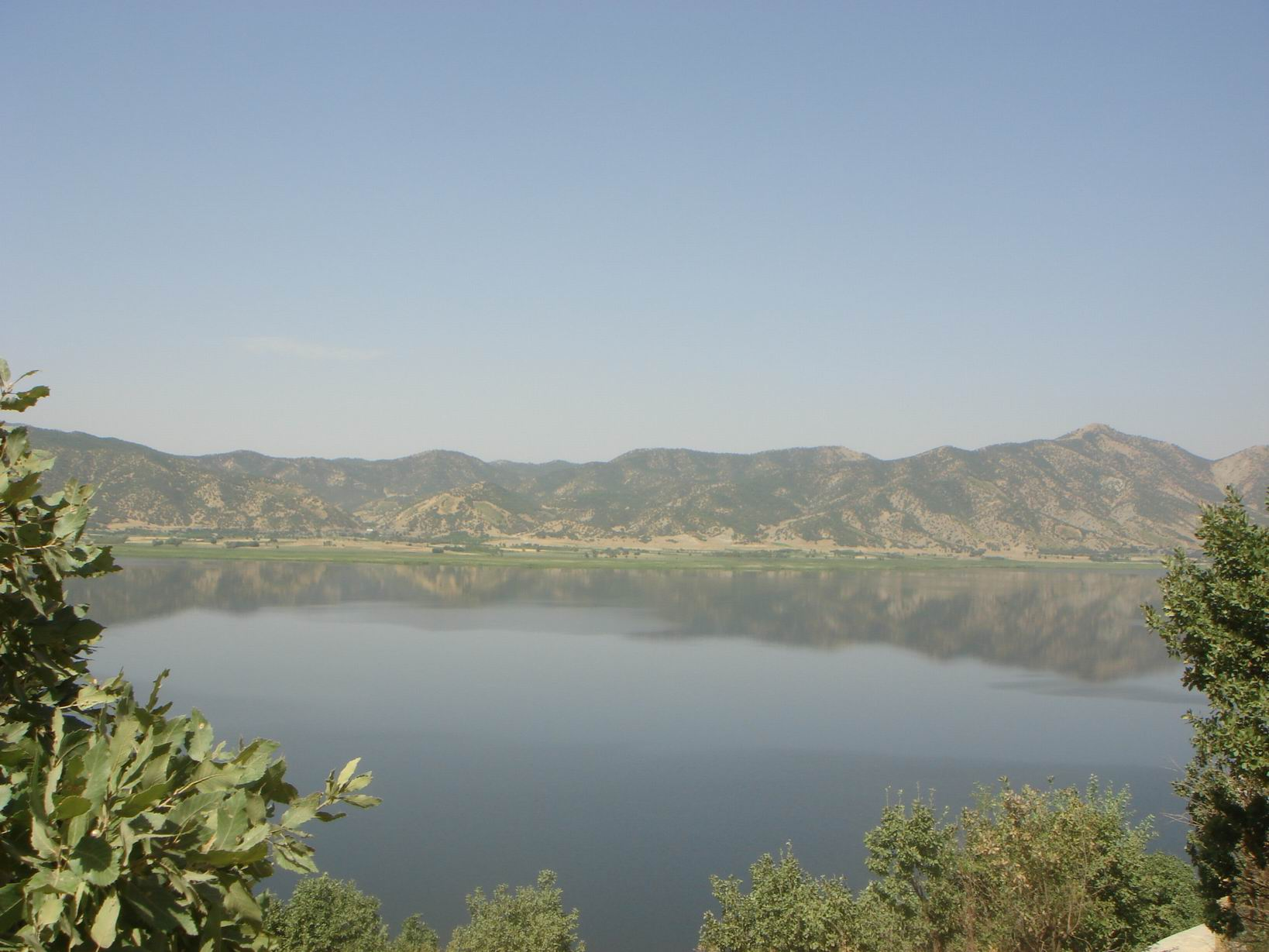

- Location within Iran
- Interactive map of Lake Zarivār زریوار; Zrewar
- Location: Zagros Mountains, Kurdistan province, Iran
- Coordinates: 35°32′N 46°08′E
- Primary outflows: Zarivār River
- Basin countries: Iran
- Max. length: 5 km (3.1 mi)
- Max. width: 1.6 km (0.99 mi)
- Surface area: 8.9 km^{2} (3.4 sq mi)
- Max. depth: 6 m (20 ft)
- Water volume: 30×10^{6} m^{3} (24,000 acre⋅ft)
- Surface elevation: 1,290 m (4,230 ft)
- Settlements: Marivan

Lake Zarivār (Persian: زریوار), is a lake in the Zagros Mountains, within Kurdistan province of western Iran. It is vital to the local economy for tourism, irrigation, and fishing purposes.

It is also known as lake Zaribar. In local Sorani Kurdish it is known as the lake Zrewar or Zrêbar or Zrêwar, زرێبار. In documents dating to the Qajar era (~1800s) it is sometimes recorded as Zerehbar and Zarbar.

== Description ==
The lake is situated in the Iranian province of Kurdistan 3 km west of Marivan and has a length of 5 km (3.1 mi) and a maximum width of 1.6 km (0.99 mi). The lake's water is fresh and has a maximum depth of 6 metres (20 ft). Its mean annual temperature is 10 °C (50 °F), located in a region with a semi-arid climate, receiving a mean annual precipitation of 300 mm.

The lake is fed by a combination of seasonal rainfall and subaqueous springs.

The lake plays a "vital role" in the local economy as a tourist attraction, source of irrigation, and fishing location.

There is much Kurdish folklore locally on the origin of the lake.

A documentary covering the Zarivar Lake was made by Shahriar Siami in 2007, titled Iran's Wetlands.

== Environmental conditions ==
From an environmental perspective, this wetland is of high importance and value as an aquatic ecosystem. Zarivar Lake is the only natural lake in the heart of the Zagros Mountains, surrounded by forests and mountains to the west, east, and north.

=== Biodiversity ===
The dominant vegetation of the region is semi-dense forests, the dominant species being oak, which together with Pyrus syriaca, Crataegus meyri and Amygdalus lycioides forms tree and shrub elements. Dense vegetation of herbaceous plants covers large areas of the lake. So far, 271 species belonging to 53 families and 183 genera have been identified and introduced around the lake. Some species, such as Tetrataenium nephrophyllum, are native to Zarivar Lake, and others, such as Carex pseudocyperus, are reported for the first time from western Iran. The presence of endemic and rare plant species in Zarivar Lake doubles the importance of the vegetation and the protection of these valuable plant genetic reserves.

== Gallery ==
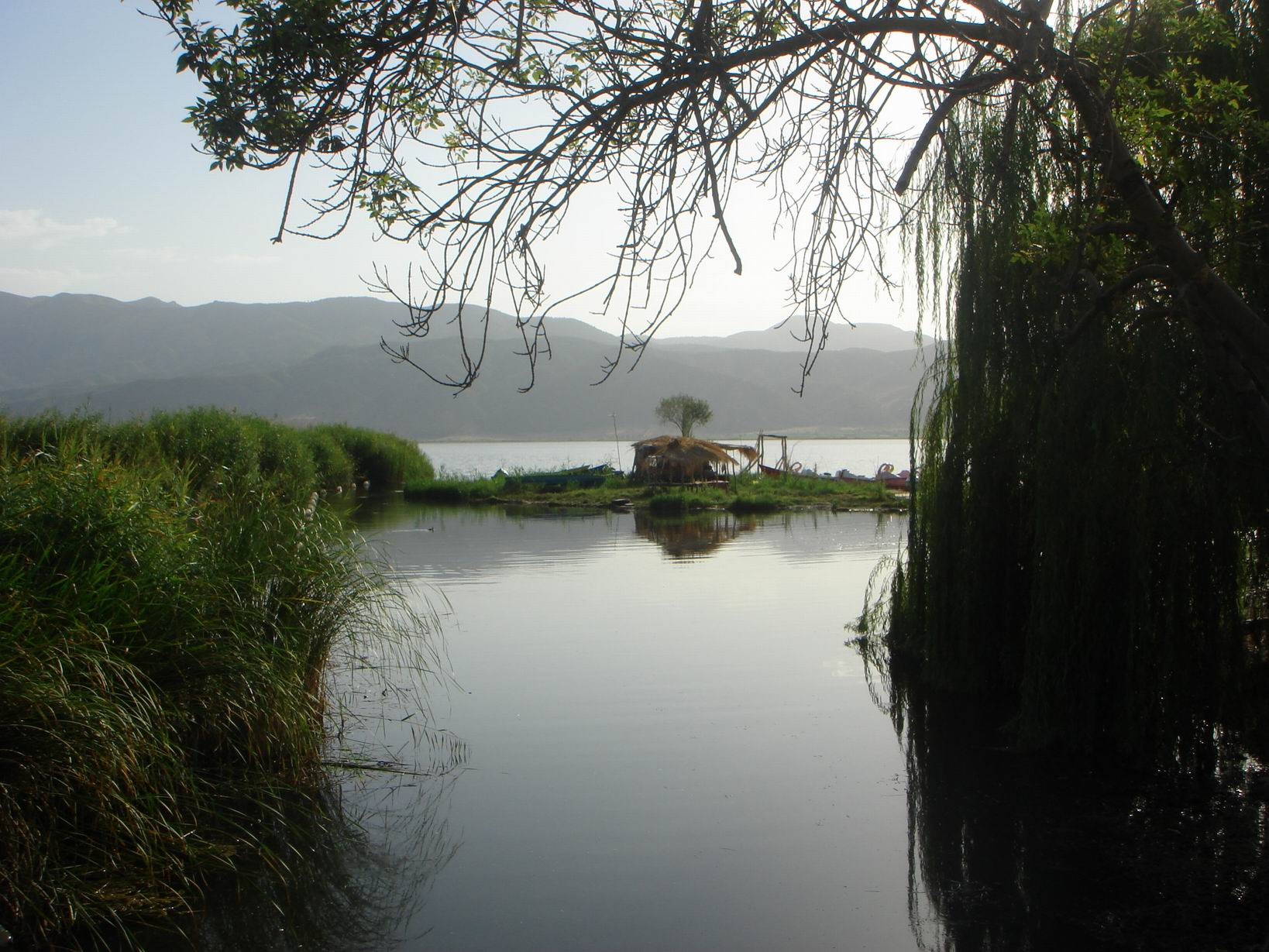
Lake Zarivar, Marivan

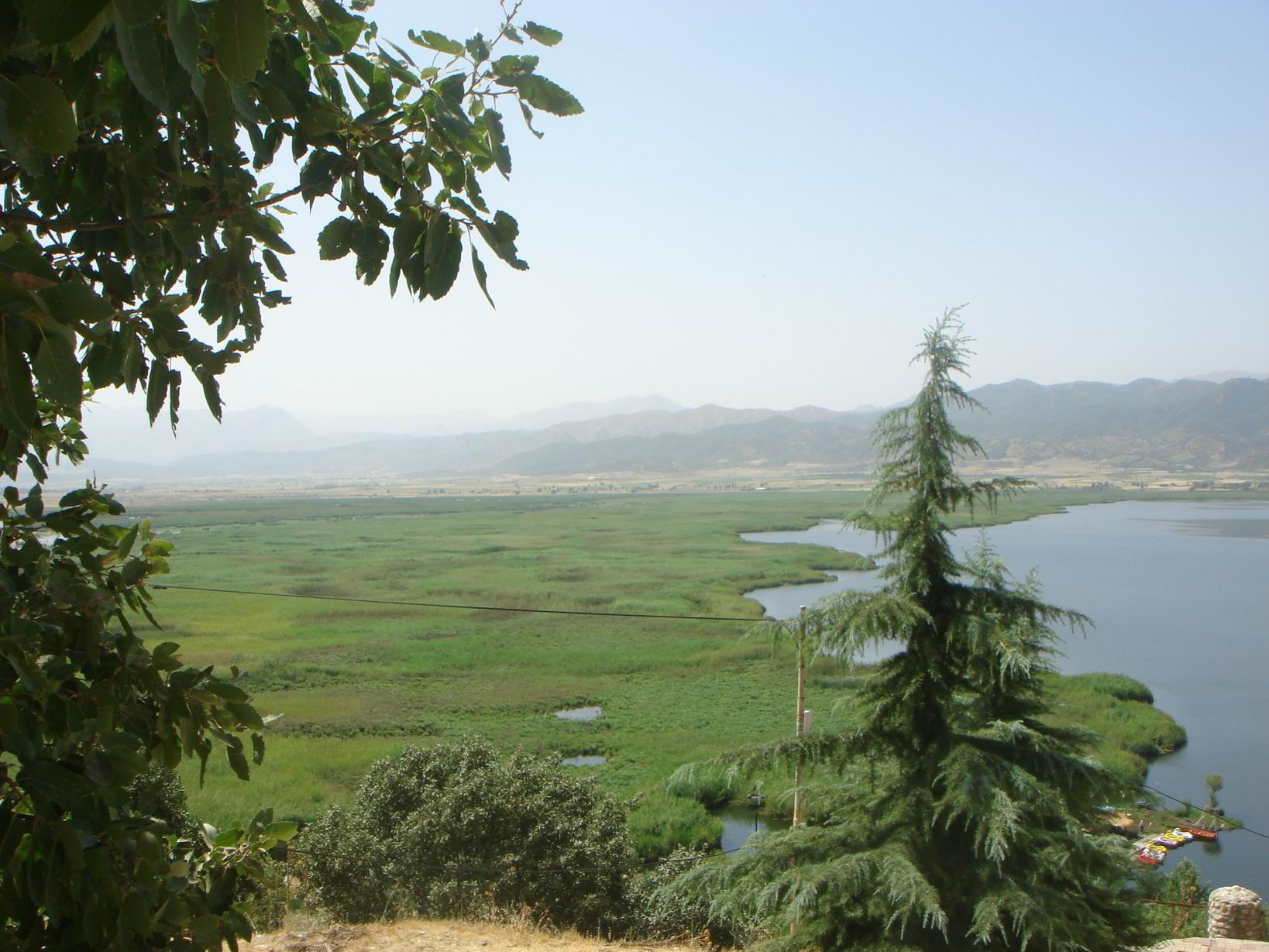
Lake Zarivar, Marivan

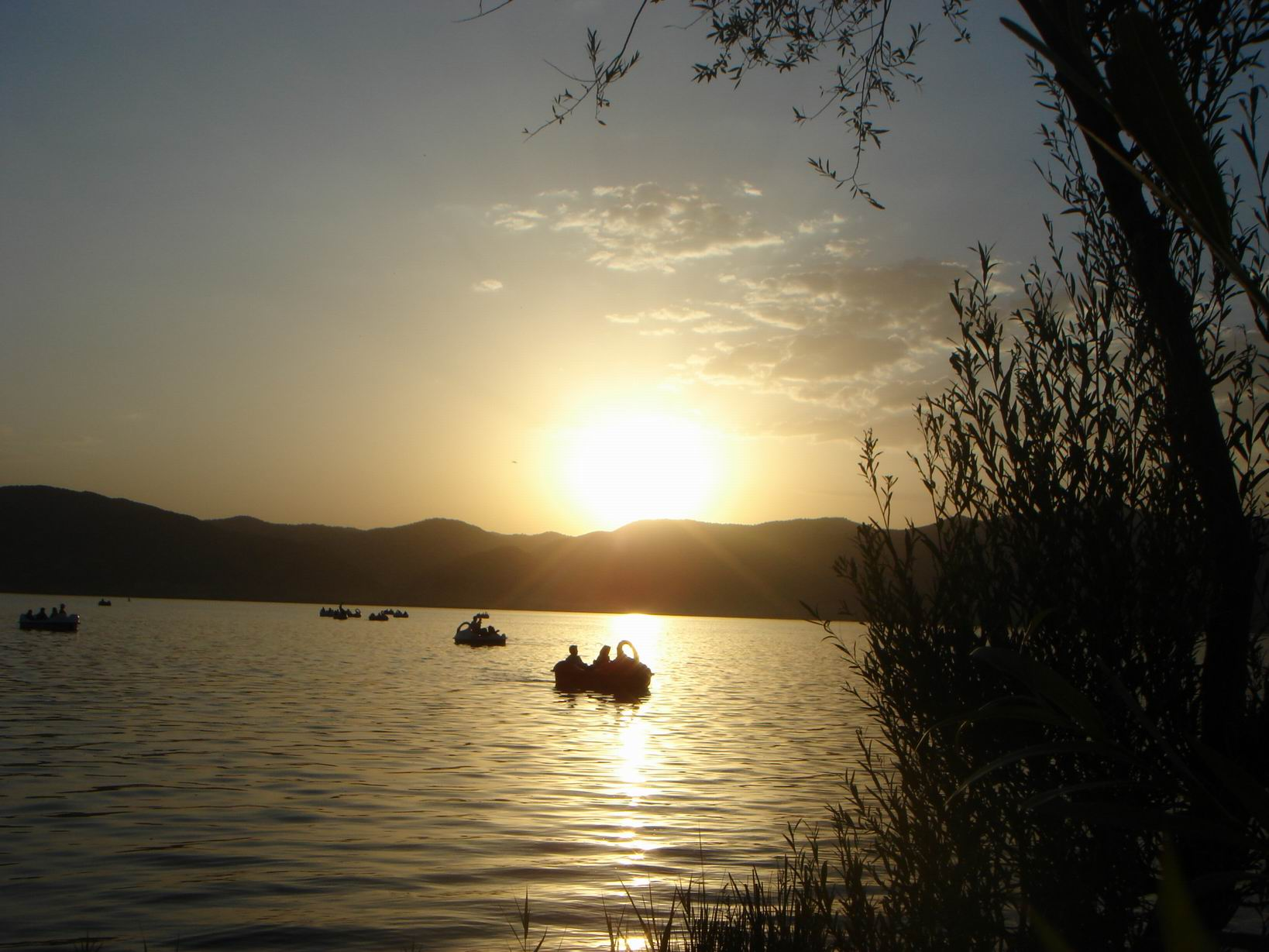
Lake Zarivar, Marivan

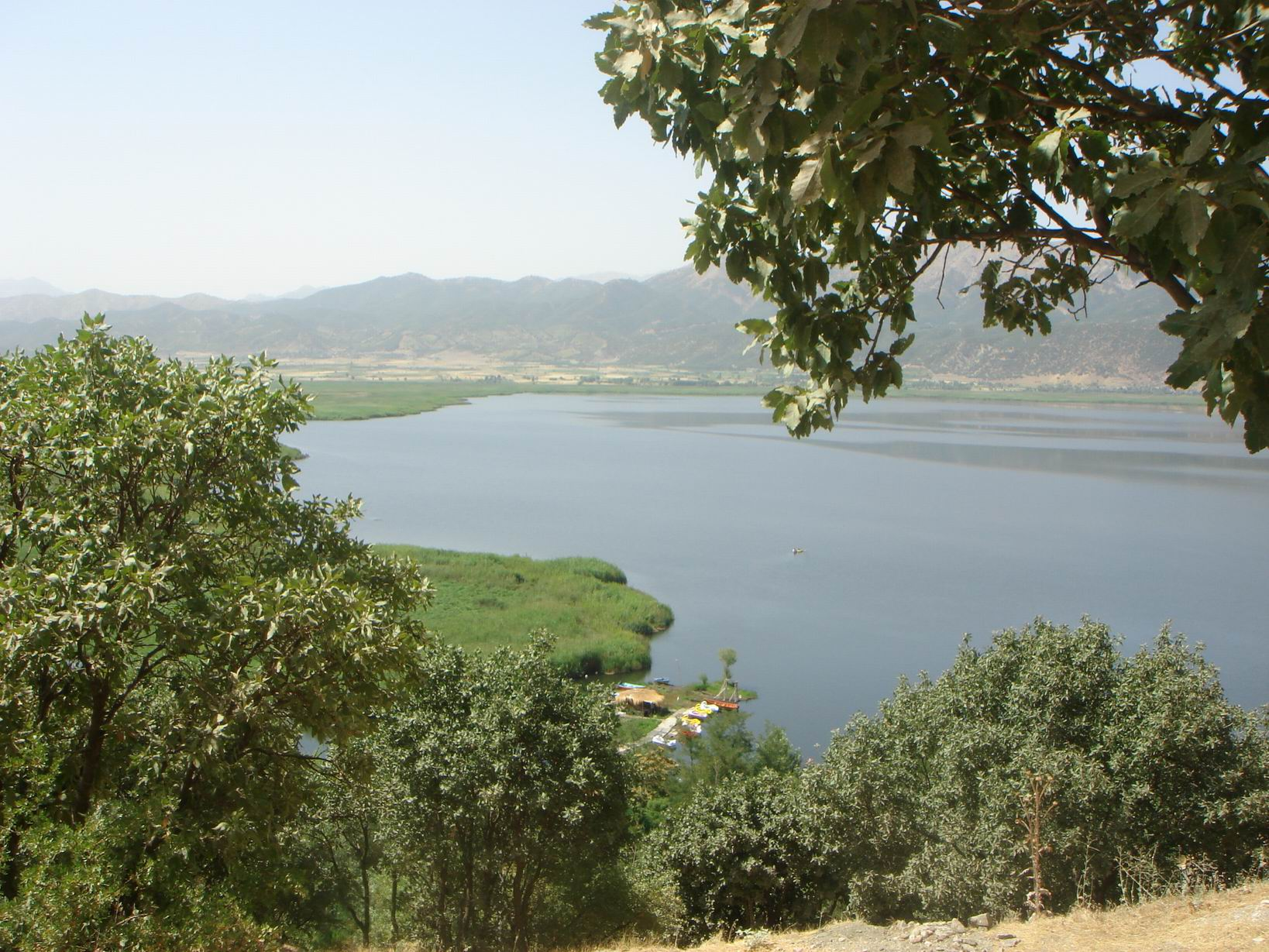
Lake Zarivar, Marivan

== Panoramic views ==
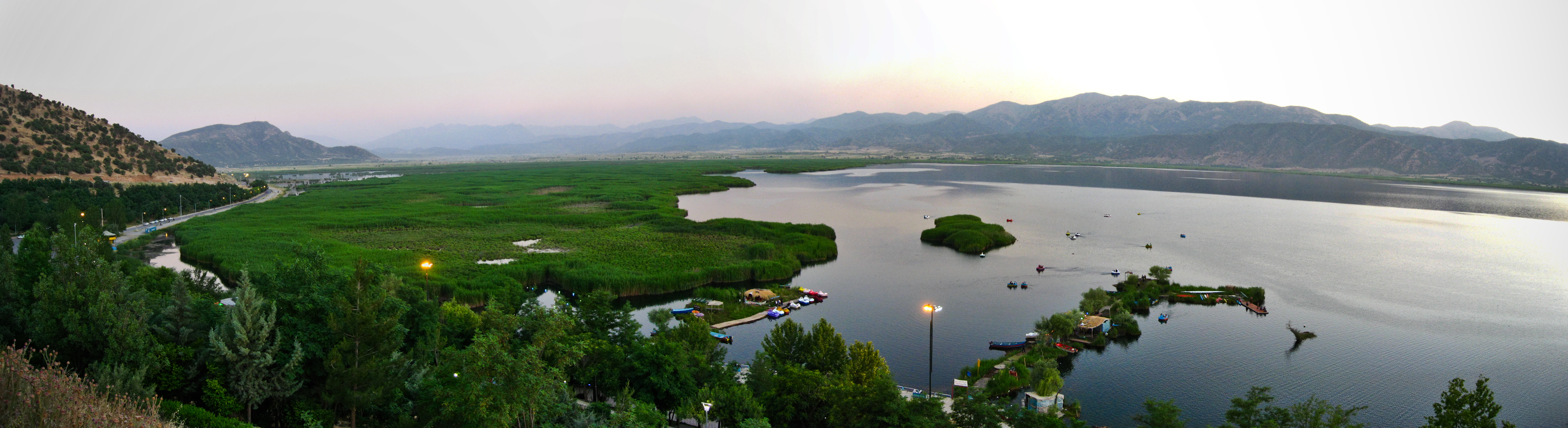
Panoramic view from Zarivar in summer of 2007
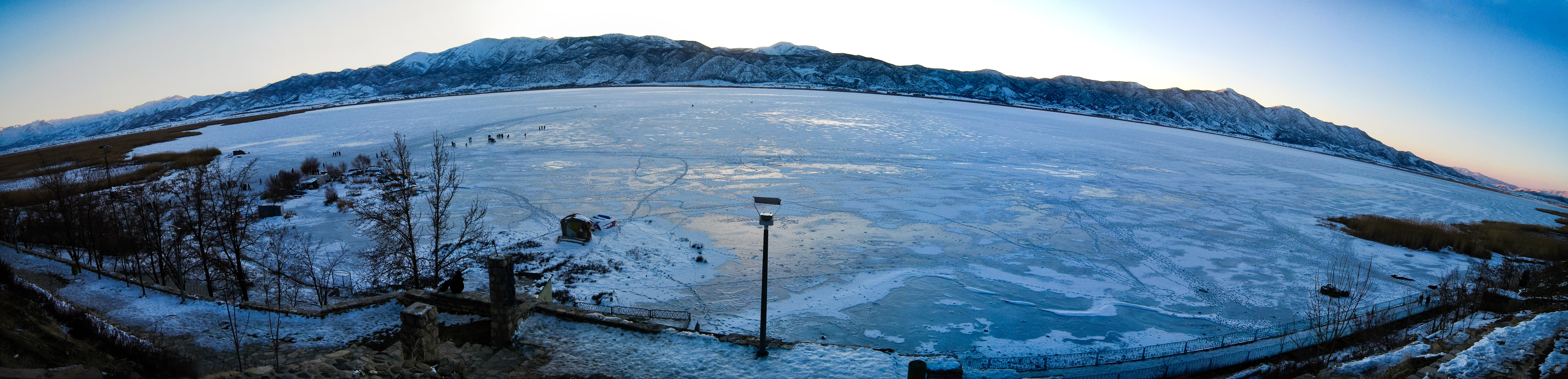
Panoramic view from totally frozen Zarivar in winter of 2008
