= Johan Peter Falk =

Swedish botanist (1732–1774)

Johan Peter Falk (26 November 1732 – 31 March 1774) was a Swedish botanist and an apostle of Carl Linnaeus. His first name is sometimes spelled "Johann"; his middle name is sometimes spelled "Pehr"; and his surname is sometimes spelled "Falck". The standard author abbreviation Falk is used to indicate this person as the author when citing a botanical name. The genus Falkia is named for him.

== Biography ==
Falk was born in the parish of Broddetorp in Västergötland, Sweden. He was the son of Peter Falck (1701–1754) and Beata Winge (1706–1771). He studied at the University of Uppsala under Carl Linnaeus as served as a tutor for his son, Carl Linnaeus the Younger. He defended his dissertation in 1762.

Falk traveled to Russia and in 1763 and became Curator for the Cabinet of Natural History in St. Petersburg. In 1765, Falck was appointed Professor in medicine and botany at the Russian Academy of Sciences.

He participated in the expedition to the central Russian province of Povolzhye, Siberia, Altay, and Transbaikal (1768–1774) organised by the Prussian scientist Peter Simon Pallas (1741–1811). Results were published in St. Petersburg at the Imperial Academy of Sciences.

In 1774, Falk killed himself in Kazan. Falk's notes were published in Germany as Beyträge zur topgraphischen Kentniß des rußischen Reichs (3 volumes, 1785–1786). They were edited by Johann Gottlieb Georgi (1729–1802).

== Literature ==
- Vera Shirokova, Alexey Sobisevich, Illustrations from Academic Expeditions in Russia: The works of Falck and Georgi iLINNAEUS | iMagazine | iStories (December 2015)
