= Erycibe paniculata =

Scientific classification
- Kingdom: Plantae
- Clade: Tracheophytes
- Clade: Angiosperms
- Clade: Eudicots
- Clade: Asterids
- Order: Solanales
- Family: Convolvulaceae
- Genus: Erycibe
- Species: E. paniculata

Binomial name
- Erycibe paniculata Roxb.

Species of plant

Erycibe paniculata is a dicot rainforest liana of the family Convolvulaceae and is native to Indo-China and southern China. It is noteworthy for its very curious petals. Each flower has a five-lobed corolla from each lobe of which project two petal-like extensions at about a 45 degree angle from each other.
