= Rapona =

Scientific classification
- Kingdom: Plantae
- Clade: Tracheophytes
- Clade: Angiosperms
- Clade: Eudicots
- Clade: Asterids
- Order: Solanales
- Family: Convolvulaceae
- Genus: Rapona; Baill.
- Species: R. tiliifolia

Binomial name
- Rapona tiliifolia (Baker) Verdc.

Genus of plants

Rapona is a monotypic genus of flowering plants belonging to the family Convolvulaceae. The only species is Rapona tiliifolia.

Its native range is Madagascar.
