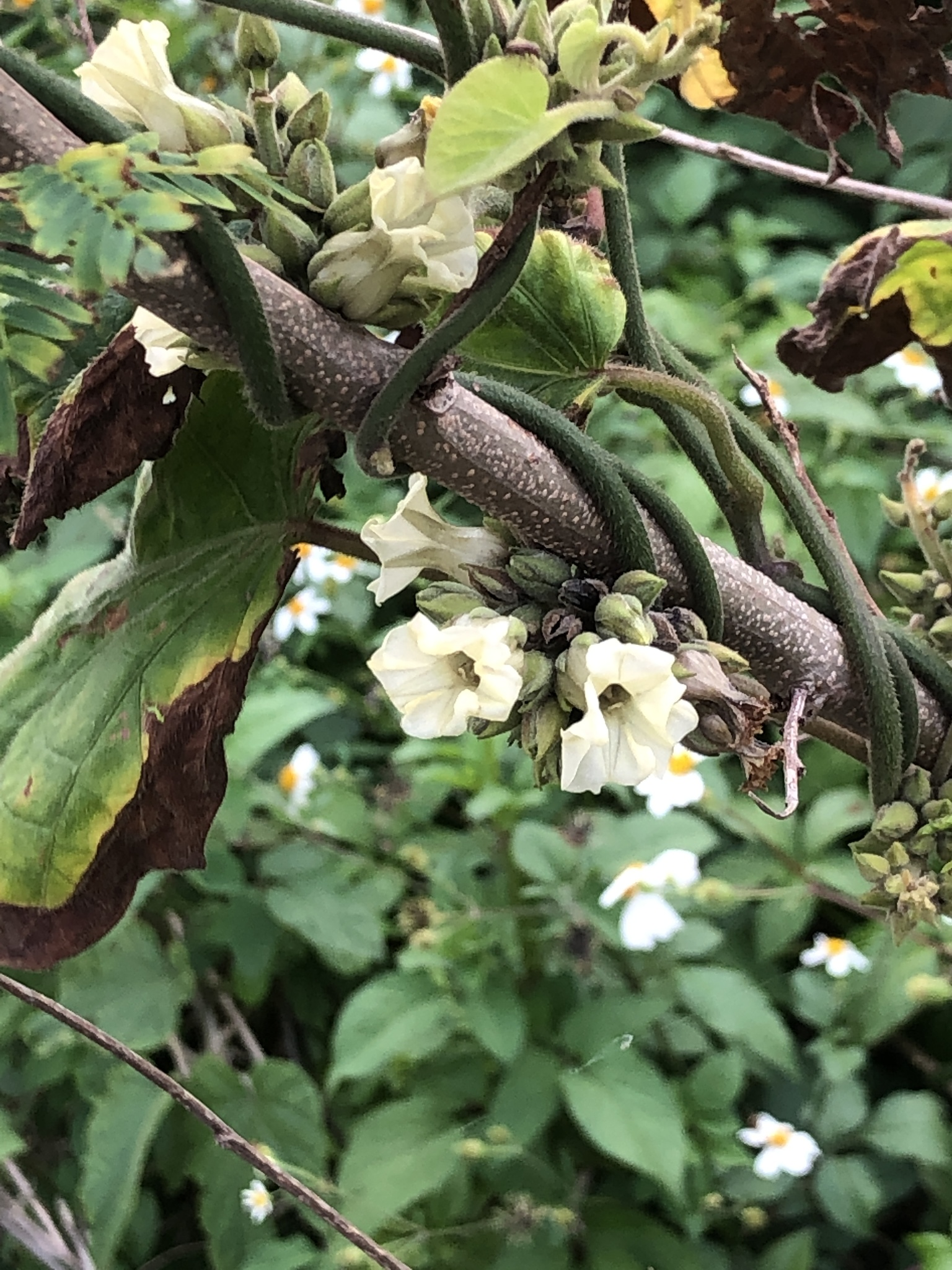
- Lepistemon binectarifer var. trichocarpus in Japan

Scientific classification
- Kingdom: Plantae
- Clade: Tracheophytes
- Clade: Angiosperms
- Clade: Eudicots
- Clade: Asterids
- Order: Solanales
- Family: Convolvulaceae
- Genus: Lepistemon; Blume

= Lepistemon =

Genus of plants

Lepistemon is a genus of flowering plants belonging to the family Convolvulaceae.

Its native range is Tropical Africa, Tropical and Subtropical Asia to Northeastern Australia.

Species:

- Lepistemon binectarifer (Wall.) Kuntze
- Lepistemon intermedius Hallier f.
- Lepistemon leiocalyx Stapf
- Lepistemon owariensis (P.Beauv.) Hallier f.
- Lepistemon parviflorus Pilg. ex Büsgen
- Lepistemon urceolatus (R.Br.) F.Muell.
- Lepistemon verdcourtii P.Mathew & Biju
