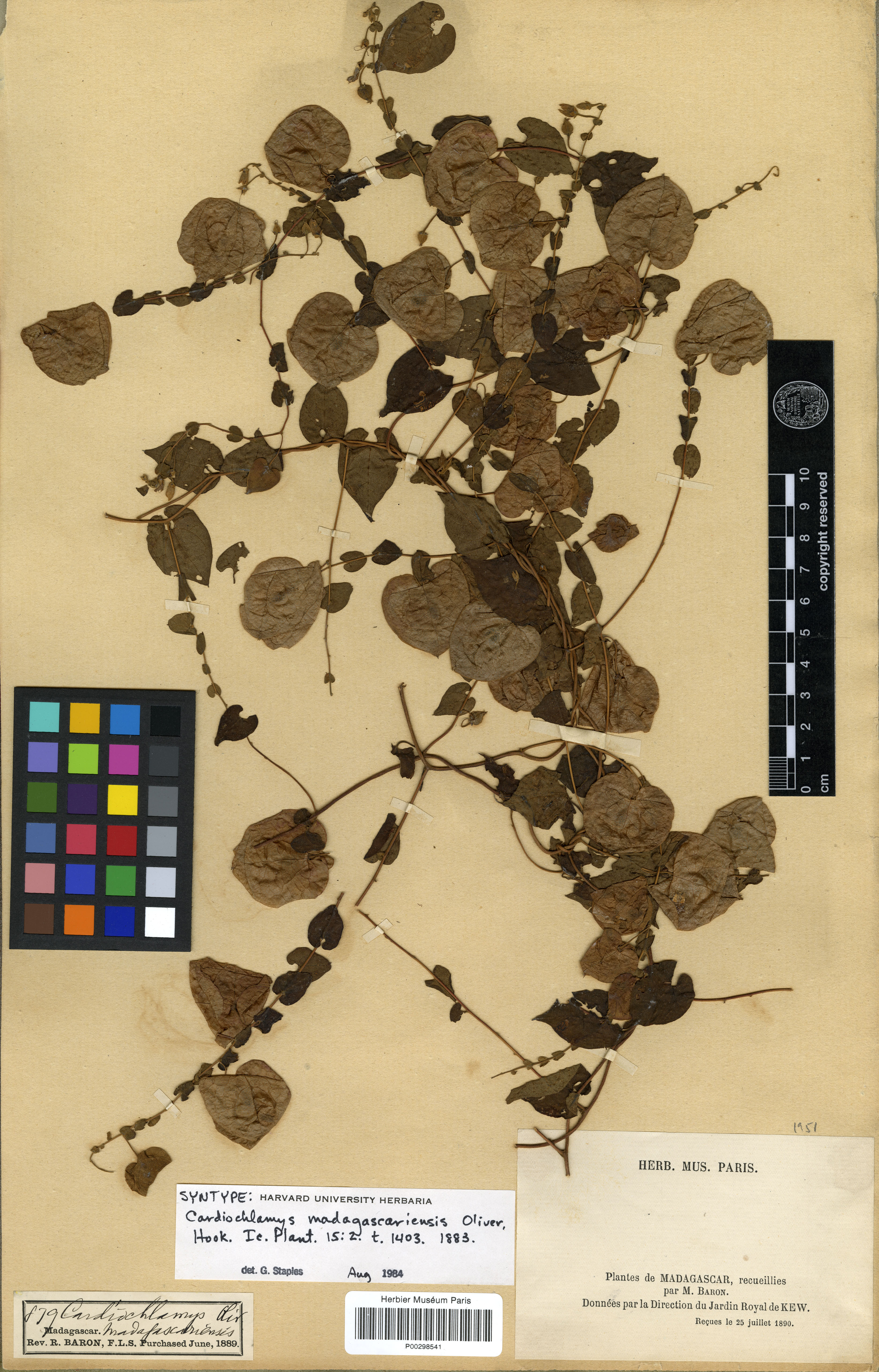
- Cardiochlamys madagascariensis specimen at National Museum of Natural History, France

Scientific classification
- Kingdom: Plantae
- Clade: Tracheophytes
- Clade: Angiosperms
- Clade: Eudicots
- Clade: Asterids
- Order: Solanales
- Family: Convolvulaceae
- Genus: Cardiochlamys; Oliv.

= Cardiochlamys =

Genus of flowering plants

Cardiochlamys is a genus of flowering plants belonging to the family Convolvulaceae.

Its native range is Madagascar.

Species:

- Cardiochlamys madagascariensis Oliv.
- Cardiochlamys velutina Hallier f.
