= Marivan =

City in Kurdistan province, Iran

Marivan Persian: مريوان Kurdish: مەریوان
- City
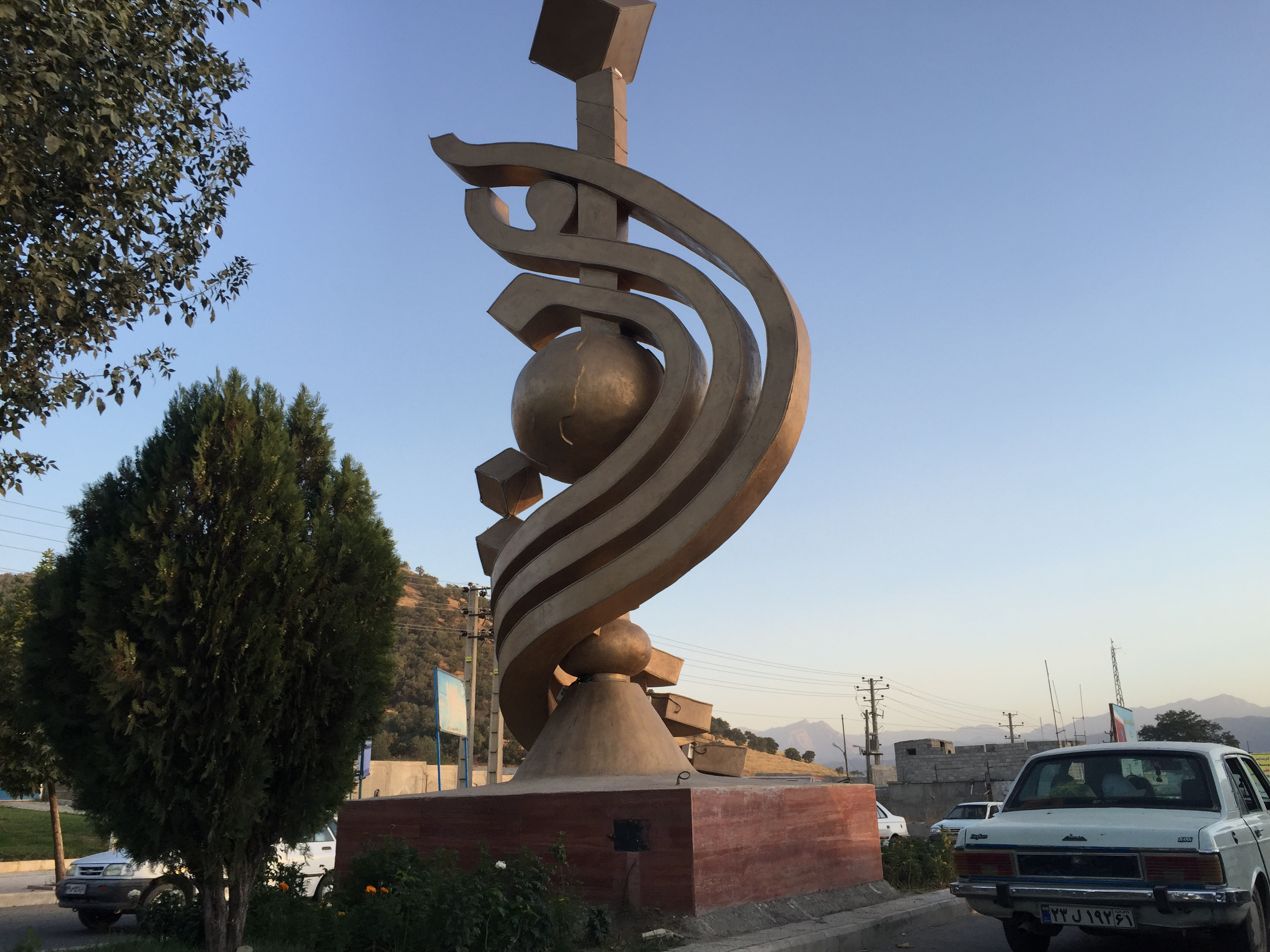
- Marivan in 2015

- Location within Iran Location within Iran Kurdistan
- Coordinates: 35°31′18″N 46°10′50″E
- Country: Iran
- Province: Kurdistan
- County: Marivan
- District: Central
- Founded: 1950s
- Elevation: 1,310 m (4,300 ft)

Population (2016)
  - Total: 136,654
- Time zone: UTC+3:30 (IRST)
- Area code: (+98)875
- Website: www.marivancity.ir

Marivan (Persian: مريوان; Kurdish: مەریوان, romanized: Merîwan) (Note: Also known as Mariwan Hashiye and Qale Marīvān (English: Fort Marivan); Kurdish: مەریوان; formerly Dezhe Shapur (دِژ شاپور), also romanized as Dezhe Shapoor; also known as Dezhe Shāhpūr) is a city in the Central District of Marivan County, Kurdistan province, Iran, serving as capital of both the county and the district.

== Demographics ==
=== Language ===
The city is populated by ethnic Kurds and the people of Marivan speak Kurdish.

The linguistic composition of the city:

Marivan linguistic composition
Language	percent
Central Kurdish	80%
Hawrami	19%
New Persian	1%

In 2023, the Marivan Cultural and Literacy Council and other institutions began updating entrance signs of the city and its countryside to include Kurdish. As of 2025, 200 village signs have been updated.

=== Population ===
At the time of the 2006 National Census, the city's population was 91,664 in 22,440 households. The following census in 2011 counted 110,464 people in 29,743 households. The 2016 census measured the population of the city as 136,654 people in 39,368 households.

== Climate ==
Climate data for Marivan (normals 1992-2010)
Month	Jan	Feb	Mar	Apr	May	Jun	Jul	Aug	Sep	Oct	Nov	Dec	Year
Record high °C (°F)	18.0 (64.4)	19.4 (66.9)	27.0 (80.6)	31.2 (88.2)	35.0 (95.0)	37.8 (100.0)	40.5 (104.9)	41.4 (106.5)	38.2 (100.8)	32.0 (89.6)	24.6 (76.3)	22.6 (72.7)	41.4 (106.5)
Daily mean °C (°F)	0.2 (32.4)	2.2 (36.0)	6.8 (44.2)	11.9 (53.4)	16.3 (61.3)	21.2 (70.2)	25.1 (77.2)	24.9 (76.8)	20.2 (68.4)	15.1 (59.2)	8.1 (46.6)	3.4 (38.1)	13.0 (55.3)
Average precipitation mm (inches)	155.2 (6.11)	167.0 (6.57)	146.6 (5.77)	119.4 (4.70)	50.9 (2.00)	3.8 (0.15)	1.3 (0.05)	0.5 (0.02)	3.9 (0.15)	37.2 (1.46)	114.6 (4.51)	130.7 (5.15)	931.1 (36.64)
Source: IRIMO

== Archaeology ==
The archaeological site of Tepe Qaleh Naneh is located in the Marivan plain near the city of Marivan. It is a large site that extends to the south and around the modern city.

Lake Zaribar is roughly at the centre of the Marivan plain. The settlement of Qaleh Naneh goes back to the Late Chalcolithic period. During that time, this already became a complex society, and had extensive cultural and commercial links with the neighbouring regions.

A joint Italo-Iranian project, ‘Qaleh Naneh: Text Excavations and Survey in the Marivan Valley’ (QaNaTES), is now conducting the scientific investigations in this region of Marivan. It is focusing on the area of the Lake Zarībār and the valley of Marivan, and their development during the Bronze and Iron Ages (c. 3000–600 BCE).

The region of Qaleh Naneh is mentioned in cuneiform texts from the time of Amar-Sin (c. 2046–2037 BC), the third ruler of the Ur III Dynasty. A series of ancient place-names is known, that referred to journeys along the mountain roads between Qaleh Naneh area and the Tanjero river valley in Iraq.

So this area has long time cultural and trade connections to the Diyala valley in Iraq. Especially the area around the modern Iraqi city of Halabja is relevant. That's where the Tanjero river joins Sirwan river and together they form the Diyala valley. Traditionally, the Diyala valley provided an important trade route between Iran and Iraq.

At the time of Ashurnasirpal II (883–859 BC), the plain of Marivan belonged to 'the region of Zamua', that was probably politically autonomous. The region served as the western frontier of the Medes during the reign of Deioces. The region continued as a major trade post during the reign of Darius III.

Some ancient texts also refer to 'a sea of Zamua'. There has been considerable confusion in past scholarship about this location. Although Assyriologist Adolf Billerbeck (1834–1908) identified it with Lake Zaribar as early as 1898, other scholars also preferred to identify it with the much bigger Lake Urmia, that is also located in Iran, but a very considerable distance (about 250km) directly to the north of Zaribar.

== Gallery ==
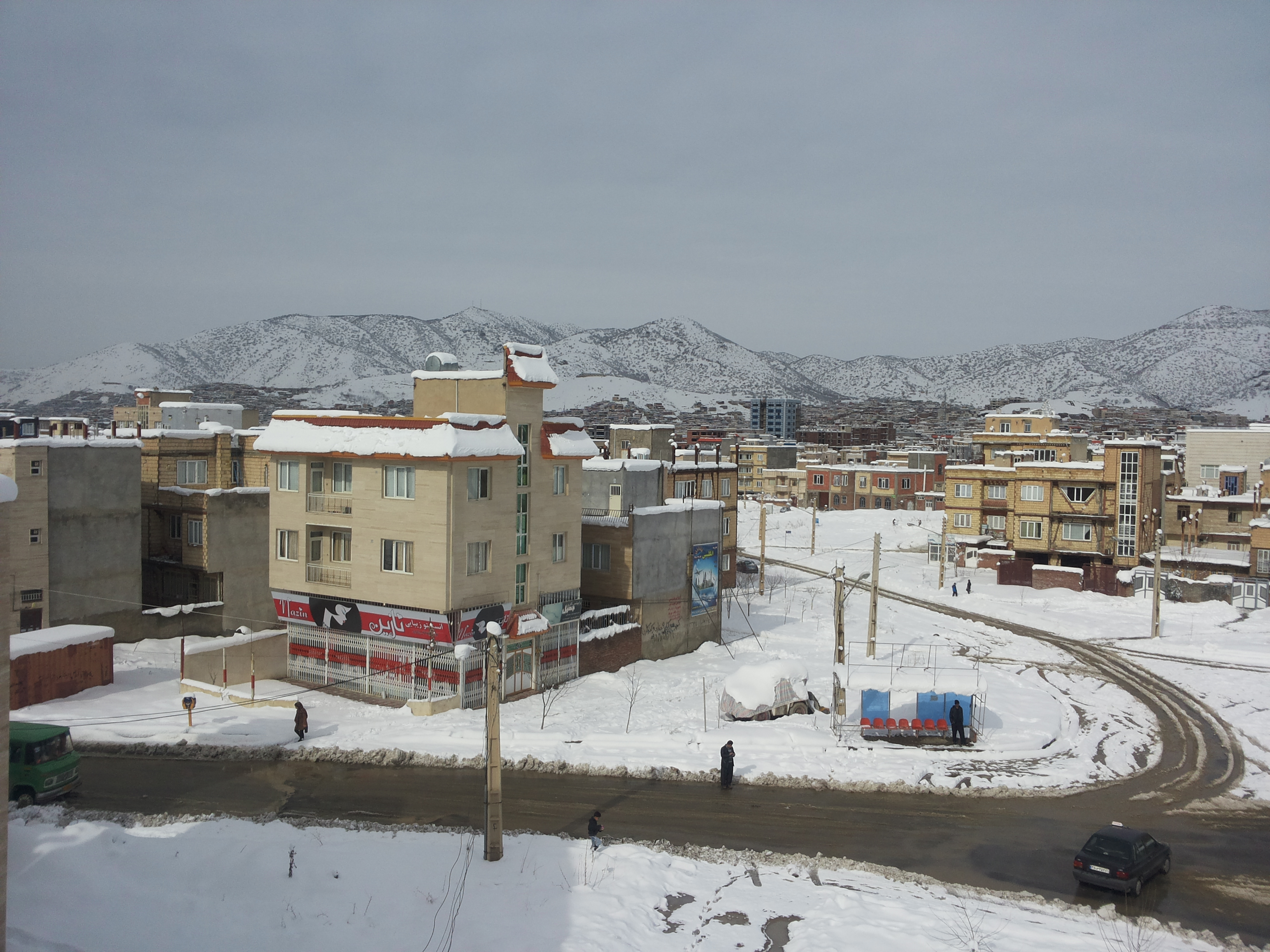
A residential neighborhood of Mariwan after a snow in 2015

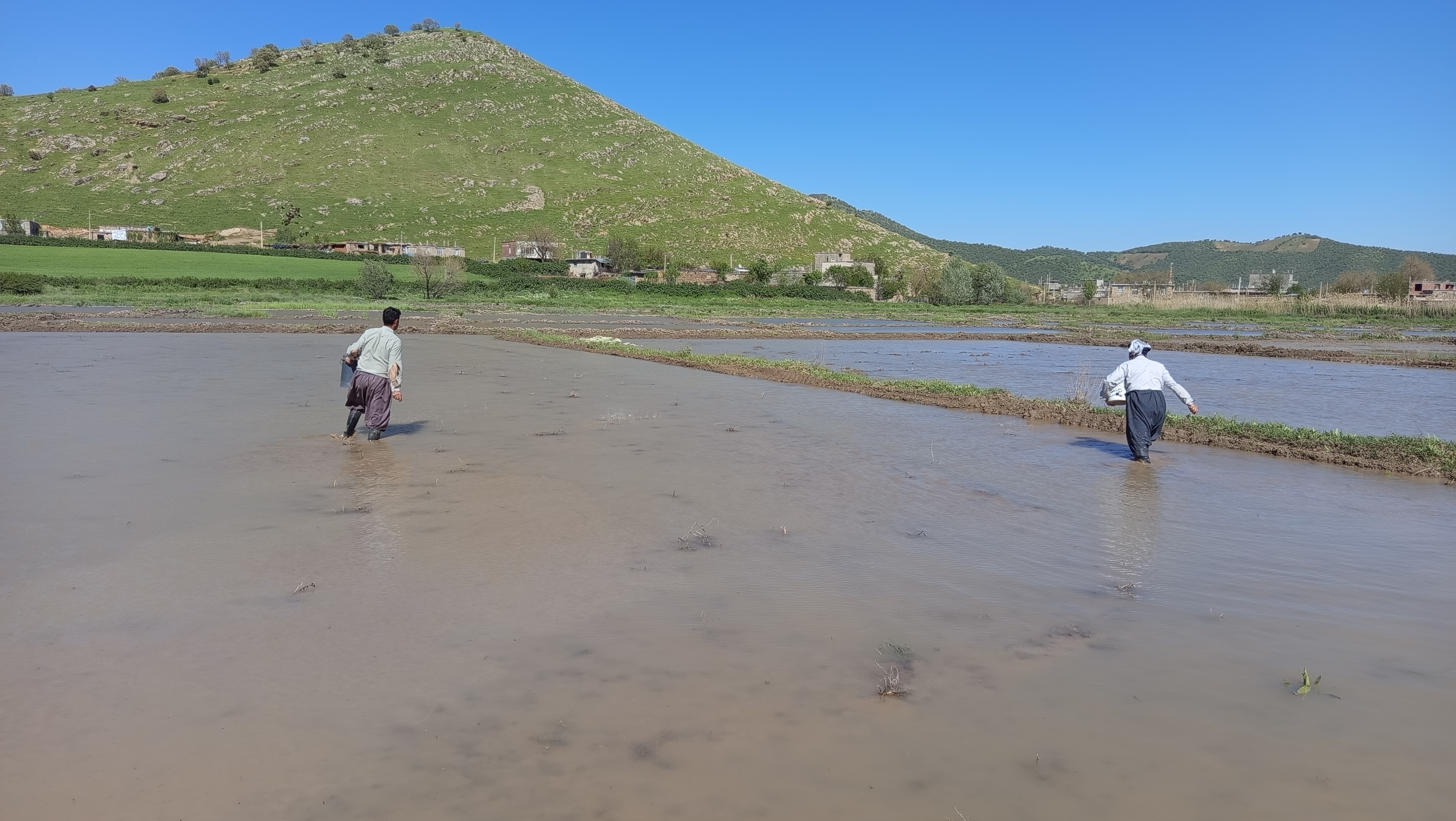
Two Kurdish men preparing a rice field in a village near Mariwan

Picture of a rice field in a village near Mariwan

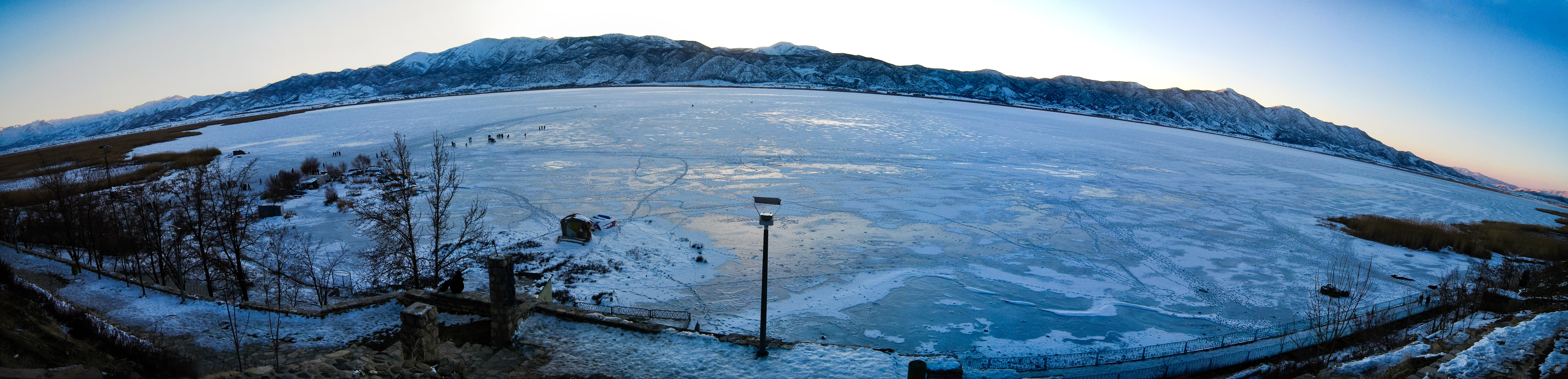
Frozen Lake Zrebar in winter, a lake in vicinity of Mariwan

== See also ==
- Shahrizor plain
