= Daustinia =

Scientific classification
- Kingdom: Plantae
- Clade: Tracheophytes
- Clade: Angiosperms
- Clade: Eudicots
- Clade: Asterids
- Order: Solanales
- Family: Convolvulaceae
- Genus: Daustinia; Buril & A.R.Simões
- Species: D. montana

Binomial name
- Daustinia montana (Moric.) Buril & A.R.Simões

Synonyms
- Austinia montana (Moric.) Buril & A.R.Simões; Ipomoea montana Moric.; Ipomoea obtusata Moric. ex Hallier f.; Ipomoea serrata Choisy; Ipomoea serrata var. triloba Choisy; Jacquemontia montana (Moric.) Meisn.; Jacquemontia obtusata (Moric. ex Hallier f.) Hallier f.; Jacquemontia serrata (Choisy) Meisn.; Jacquemontia serrata var. major Meisn.; Jacquemontia serrata var. minor Meisn.; Jacquemontia serrata var. obtusata Moric. ex Meisn.; Thyella montana (Moric.) House; Thyella serrata (Choisy) House

Species of flowering plant

Daustinia is a monotypic genus of flowering plants belonging to the family Convolvulaceae. It only contains one known species, Daustinia montana.

Its native range is eastern Brazil.

The genus name of Daustinia is in honour of Daniel Frank Austin (1943–2015), an American botanist from the University of Arizona. The Latin specific epithet of montana means "of the mountains" referring to the habitat of the plant. Both the genus and the species were first described and published in Phytotaxa Vol.197 on page 60 in 2015.
