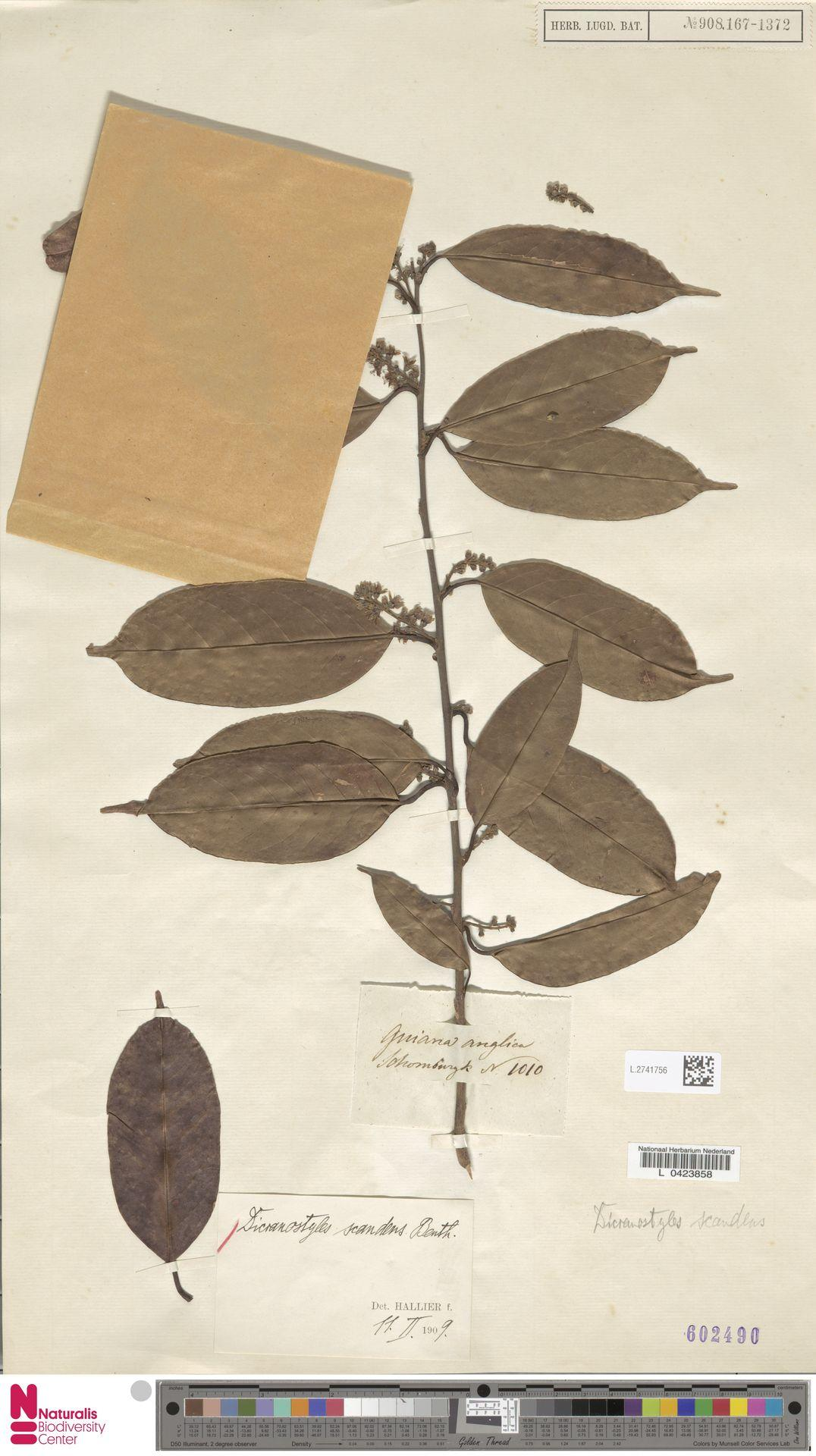
- Dicranostyles

Scientific classification
- Kingdom: Plantae
- Clade: Tracheophytes
- Clade: Angiosperms
- Clade: Eudicots
- Clade: Asterids
- Order: Solanales
- Family: Convolvulaceae
- Genus: Dicranostyles; Benth.

= Dicranostyles =

Genus of plants

Dicranostyles is a genus of flowering plants belonging to the family Convolvulaceae.

Its native range is Central and Southern Tropical America.

Species:

- Dicranostyles ampla Ducke
- Dicranostyles costanensis Steyerm. & D.F.Austin
- Dicranostyles densa Spruce ex Meisn.
- Dicranostyles falconiana (Barroso) Ducke
- Dicranostyles globostigma D.F.Austin
- Dicranostyles guianensis Mennega
- Dicranostyles holostyla Ducke
- Dicranostyles integra Ducke
- Dicranostyles laxa Ducke
- Dicranostyles longifolia Ducke
- Dicranostyles mildbraediana Pilg.
- Dicranostyles scandens Benth.
- Dicranostyles sericea Gleason
- Dicranostyles solimoesensis Mennega
- Dicranostyles villosa Ducke
