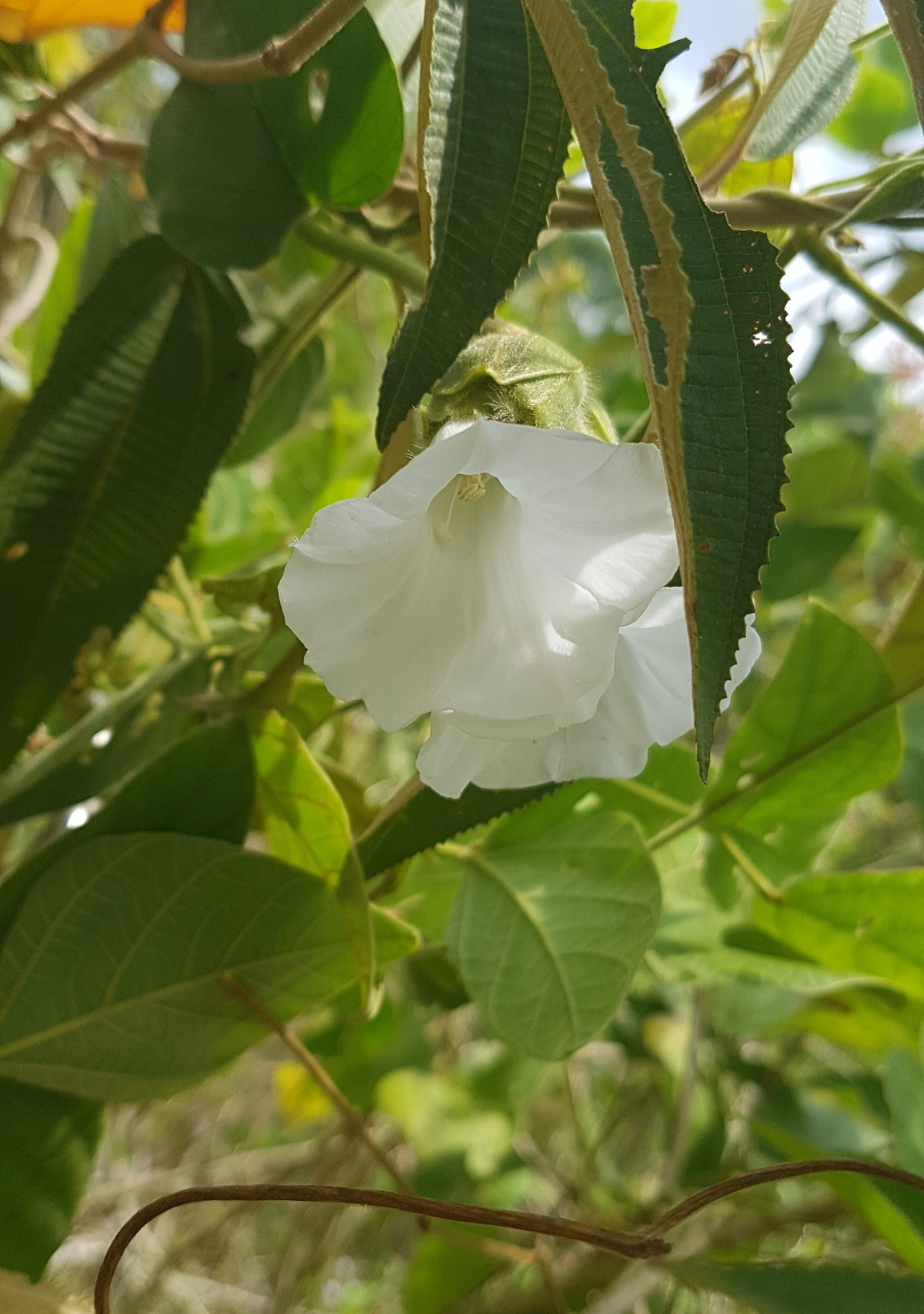
- Odonellia hirtiflora

Scientific classification
- Kingdom: Plantae
- Clade: Tracheophytes
- Clade: Angiosperms
- Clade: Eudicots
- Clade: Asterids
- Order: Solanales
- Family: Convolvulaceae
- Genus: Odonellia; K.R.Robertson

= Odonellia =

Genus of flowering plant

Odonellia is a genus of flowering plants belonging to the family Convolvulaceae.

Its native range is Mexico and parts of Southern Tropical America. It is found in Belize, Bolivia, Brazil, Colombia, Costa Rica, Ecuador, Guatemala, Mexico, Nicaragua, Panamá, Peru and Venezuela.

The genus name of Odonellia is in honour of Carlos Alberto O'Donell (1912–1954), an Argentinian botanist at the Miguel Lillo Foundation in San Miguel de Tucumán. It was first described and published in Brittonia Vol.34 on page 417 in 1982.

== Known species ==
According to Kew:

- Odonellia eriocephala (Moric.) K.R.Robertson
- Odonellia hirtiflora (M.Martens & Galeotti) K.R.Robertson
