= Lepistemonopsis =

Scientific classification
- Kingdom: Plantae
- Clade: Tracheophytes
- Clade: Angiosperms
- Clade: Eudicots
- Clade: Asterids
- Order: Solanales
- Family: Convolvulaceae
- Genus: Lepistemonopsis; Dammer
- Species: L. volkensii

Binomial name
- Lepistemonopsis volkensii Dammer

Genus of plants

Lepistemonopsis is a monotypic genus of flowering plants belonging to the family Convolvulaceae. The only species is Lepistemonopsis volkensii.

Its native range is Northeastern and Eastern Tropical Africa.
