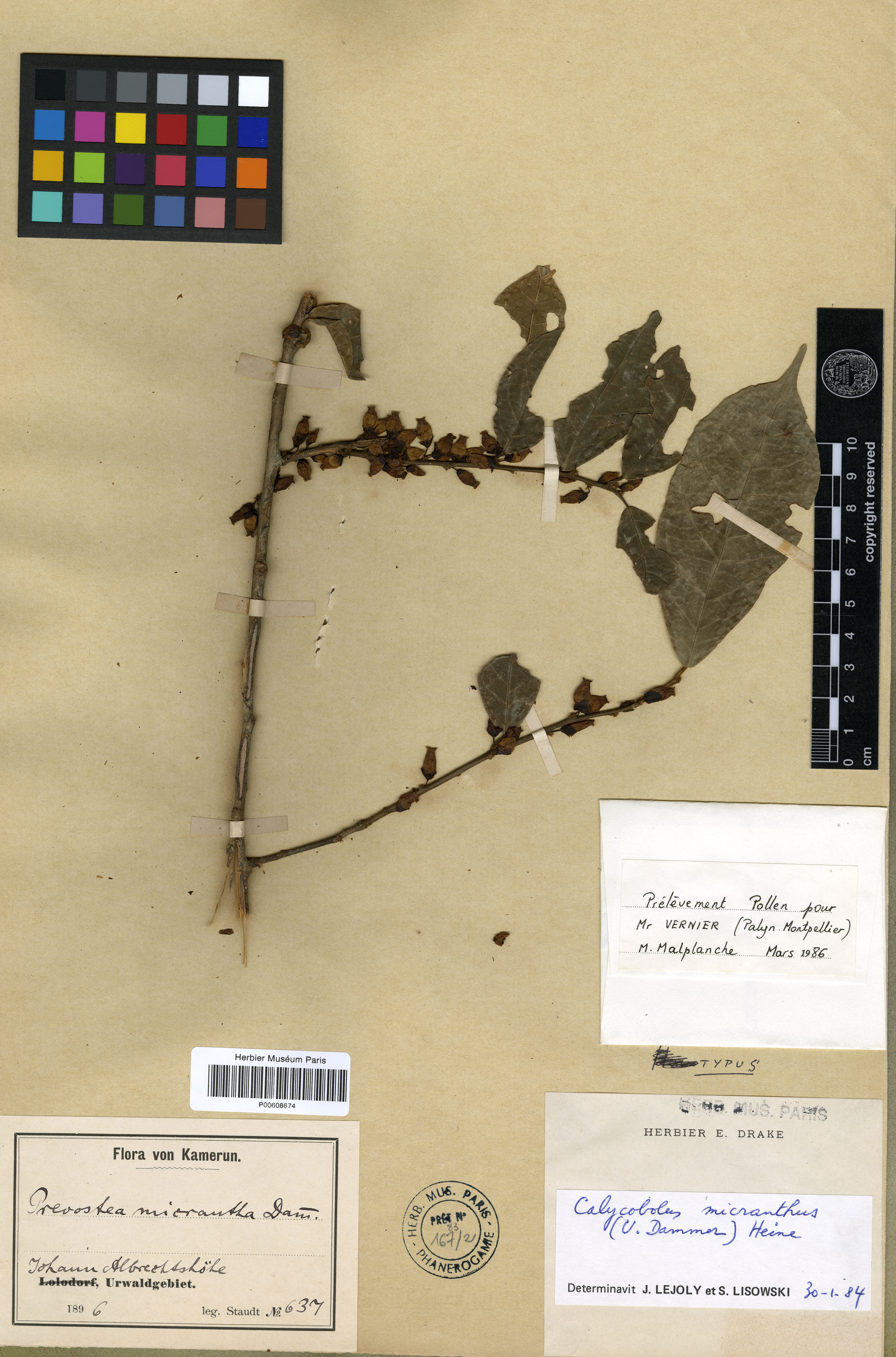
- Calycobolus micranthus specimen at National Museum of Natural History, France

Scientific classification
- Kingdom: Plantae
- Clade: Tracheophytes
- Clade: Angiosperms
- Clade: Eudicots
- Clade: Asterids
- Order: Solanales
- Family: Convolvulaceae
- Genus: Calycobolus; Willd. ex Schult.

= Calycobolus =

Genus of flowering plants

Calycobolus is a genus of flowering plants belonging to the family Convolvulaceae.

Its native range is Southern Tropical America, Western Africa to Angola.

Species:

- Calycobolus acuminatus (Pilg.) Heine
- Calycobolus acutus (Pilg.) Heine
- Calycobolus africanus (G.Don) Heine
- Calycobolus bampsianus Lejoly & Lisowski
- Calycobolus cabrae (De Wild. & T.Durand) Heine
- Calycobolus campanulatus (K.Schum. ex Hallier f.) Heine
- Calycobolus claessensii (De Wild.) Heine
- Calycobolus gilgianus (Pilg.) Heine
- Calycobolus glaber (Kunth) House
- Calycobolus goodii Heine
- Calycobolus hallianus Breteler
- Calycobolus heineanus Lejoly & Lisowski
- Calycobolus heudelotii (Baker ex Oliv.) Heine
- Calycobolus insignis (Rendle) Heine
- Calycobolus kasaiensis Lejoly & Lisowski
- Calycobolus lanulosus D.F.Austin
- Calycobolus longiracemosus Lejoly & Lisowski
- Calycobolus micranthus (Dammer) Heine
- Calycobolus parviflorus (Mangenot) Heine
- Calycobolus petitianus Lejoly & Lisowski
- Calycobolus racemosus (R.D.Good) Heine
- Calycobolus robynsianus Lejoly & Lisowski
- Calycobolus sericeus (Kunth) House
- Calycobolus upembaensis Lejoly & Lisowski
- Calycobolus zairensis Lejoly & Lisowski
