= Remirema =

Scientific classification
- Kingdom: Plantae
- Clade: Tracheophytes
- Clade: Angiosperms
- Clade: Eudicots
- Clade: Asterids
- Order: Solanales
- Family: Convolvulaceae
- Genus: Remirema; Kerr

Genus of flowering plants

Remirema is a genus of flowering plants belonging to the family Convolvulaceae.

Its native range is Indo-China.

Species:

- Remirema bracteata Kerr
