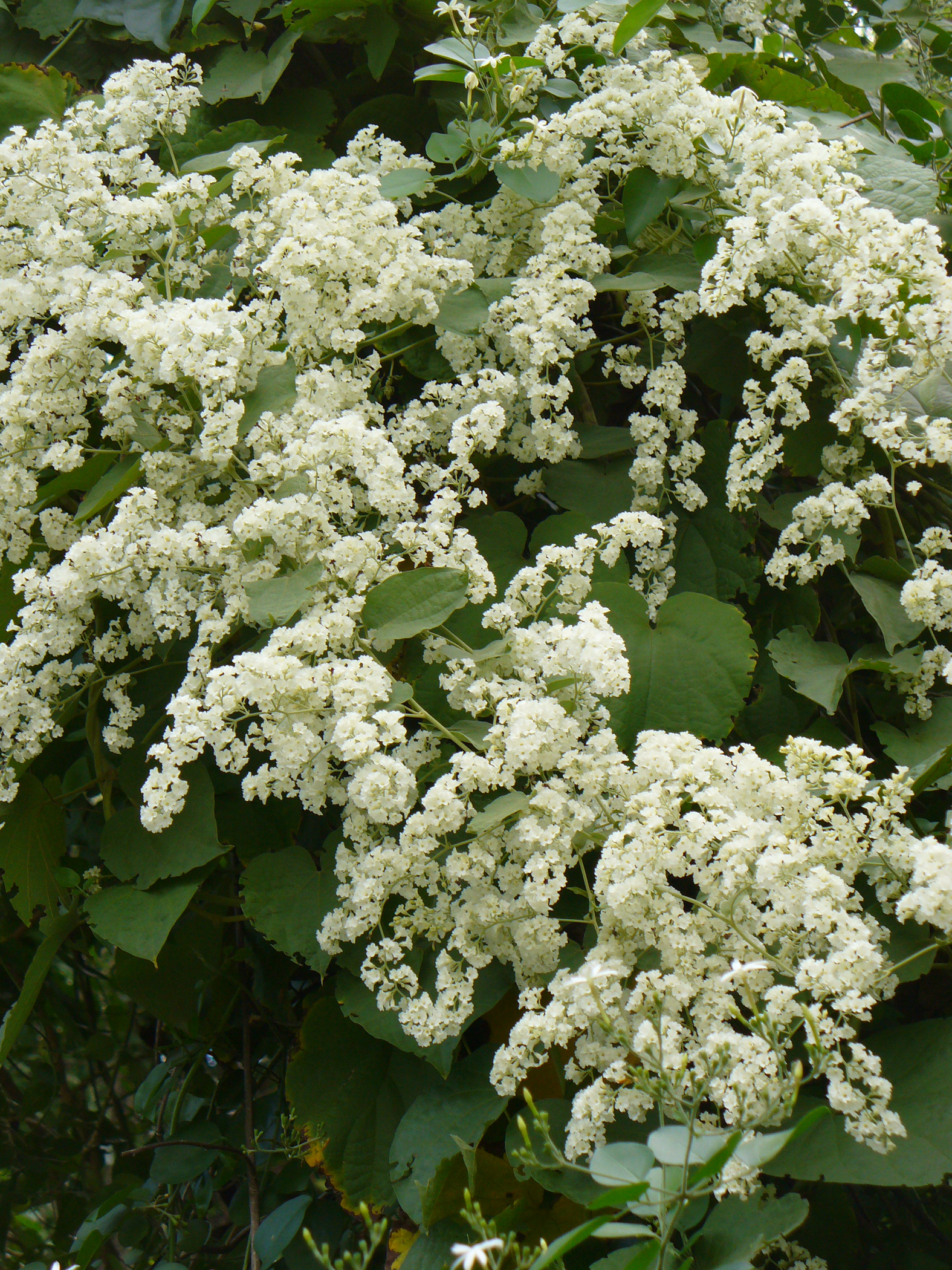
- Poranopsis paniculata

Scientific classification
- Kingdom: Plantae
- Clade: Tracheophytes
- Clade: Angiosperms
- Clade: Eudicots
- Clade: Asterids
- Order: Solanales
- Family: Convolvulaceae
- Genus: Poranopsis; Roberty

= Poranopsis =

Genus of plants

Poranopsis is a genus of flowering plants belonging to the family Convolvulaceae.

Its native range is Indian subcontinent to Southern Central China and Indo-China.

Species:

- Poranopsis discifera (C.K.Schneid.) Staples
- Poranopsis paniculata (Roxb.) Roberty
- Poranopsis sinensis (Hand.-Mazz.) Staples
