= Paralepistemon =

Scientific classification
- Kingdom: Plantae
- Clade: Tracheophytes
- Clade: Angiosperms
- Clade: Eudicots
- Clade: Asterids
- Order: Solanales
- Family: Convolvulaceae
- Genus: Paralepistemon; Lejoly & Lisowski

Genus of plants

Paralepistemon is a genus of flowering plants belonging to the family Convolvulaceae.

Its native range is Southern Congo to KwaZulu-Natal.

Species:

- Paralepistemon curtoi (Rendle) Lejoly & Lisowski
- Paralepistemon shirensis (Oliv.) Lejoly & Lisowski
