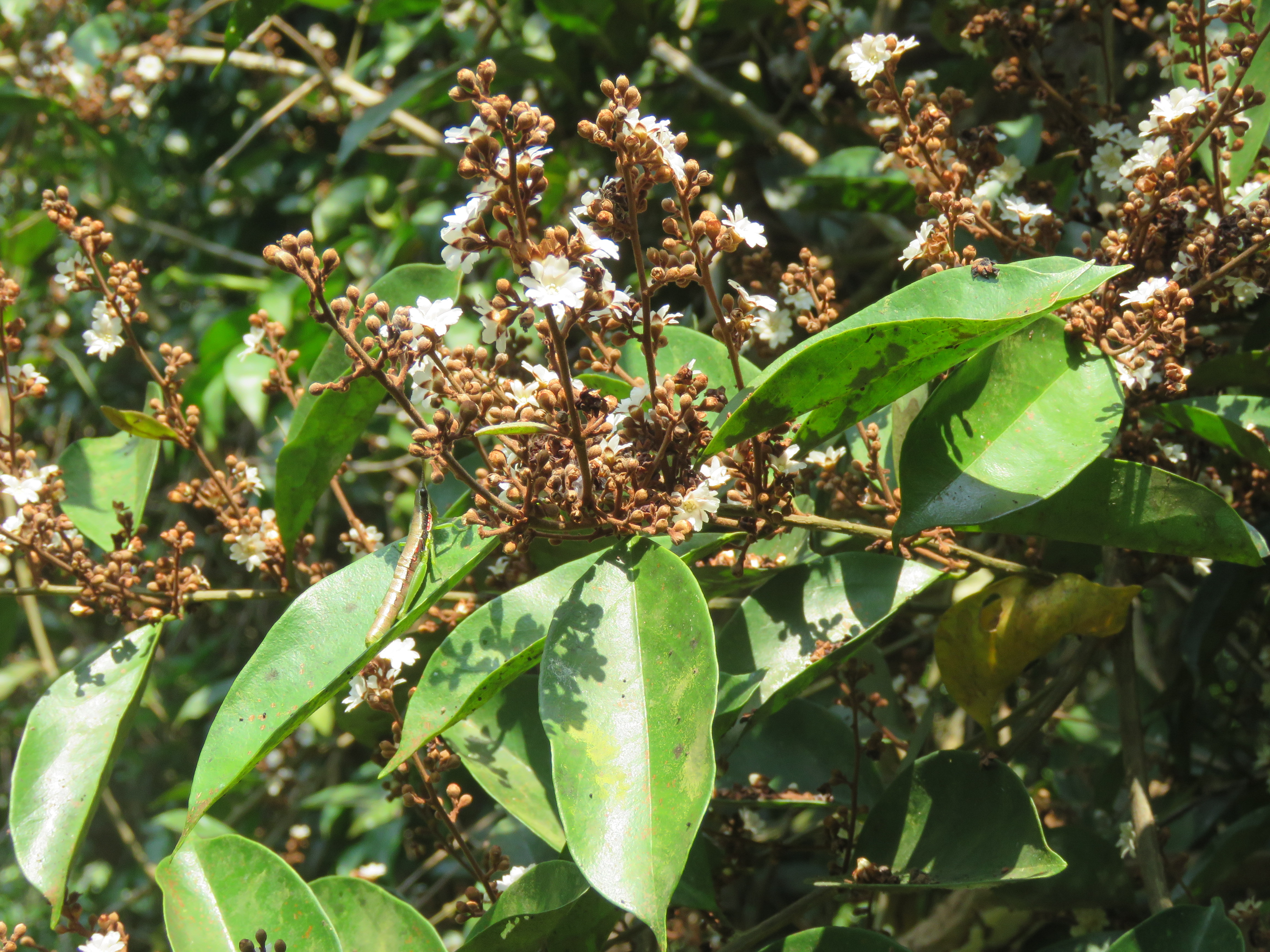
- Erycibe paniculata in Neeliyar Kottam, a sacred grove

Scientific classification
- Kingdom: Plantae
- Clade: Tracheophytes
- Clade: Angiosperms
- Clade: Eudicots
- Clade: Asterids
- Order: Solanales
- Family: Convolvulaceae
- Genus: Erycibe; Roxb.

Synonyms
- Catonia Vahl; Erimatalia Schult.; Fissipetalum Merr.

= Erycibe =

Genus of flowering plants

Erycibe is a genus of plants in the family Convolvulaceae, found in the Andaman Islands, Sri Lanka, India including Assam, Bangladesh, Myanmar, east Himalaya, southern and southeastern China including Hainan and Taiwan, Southeast Asia, Malesia, Papuasia, Australia, and Japan including the Ryukyu Islands.

== Species ==
Currently accepted species include:

- Erycibe aenea Prain
- Erycibe albida Prain
- Erycibe beccariana Hoogland
- Erycibe borneensis (Merr.) Hoogland
- Erycibe brassii Hoogland
- Erycibe bullata Ridl. ex Hoogland
- Erycibe carrii Hoogland
- Erycibe citriniflora Griff. – Burmese: အိပ်မွေ့
- Erycibe clemensiae Ooststr.
- Erycibe coccinea (F.M.Bailey) Hoogland
- Erycibe cochinchinensis Gagnep.
- Erycibe coriacea Wall. ex Choisy
- Erycibe crassipes Ridl. ex Hoogland
- Erycibe crassiuscula Gagnep.
- Erycibe elliptilimba Merr. & Chun
- Erycibe expansa Wall. ex G.Don
- Erycibe festiva Prain
- Erycibe floribunda Pilg.
- Erycibe forbesii Prain
- Erycibe glaucescens Wall. ex Choisy
- Erycibe glomerata Blume
- Erycibe grandiflora Adelb. ex Hoogland
- Erycibe grandifolia Merr. ex Hoogland
- Erycibe griffithii C.B.Clarke
- Erycibe hainanensis Merr.
- Erycibe hellwigii Prain
- Erycibe henryi Prain
- Erycibe hollrungii Hoogland
- Erycibe impressa Hoogland
- Erycibe induta Pilg.
- Erycibe kinabaluensis Hoogland
- Erycibe laurifolia D.G.Long
- Erycibe leucoxyloides King ex Ridl.
- Erycibe macrophylla Hallier f.
- Erycibe magnifica Prain
- Erycibe maingayi C.B.Clarke
- Erycibe malaccensis C.B.Clarke
- Erycibe micrantha Hallier f.
- Erycibe myriantha Merr.
- Erycibe nitidula Pilg.
- Erycibe obtusifolia Benth.
- Erycibe oligantha Merr. & Chun
- Erycibe paniculata Roxb.
- Erycibe papuana Wernham
- Erycibe pedicellata Ridl. ex Hoogland
- Erycibe peguensis (C.B.Clarke) Prain
- Erycibe praecipua Prain
- Erycibe puberula Hoogland
- Erycibe ramiflora Hallier f.
- Erycibe ramosii Hoogland
- Erycibe rheedei Blume
- Erycibe sapotacea Hallier f. & Prain ex Prain
- Erycibe sargentii Merr.
- Erycibe schlechteri Pilg.
- Erycibe schmidtii Craib
- Erycibe sericea Hoogland
- Erycibe sinii F.C.How
- Erycibe stapfiana Prain
- Erycibe stenophylla Hoogland
- Erycibe strigosa Prain
- Erycibe subglabra Scheff. ex Hoogland
- Erycibe subsericea Hoogland
- Erycibe subspicata Wall. ex G.Don
- Erycibe sumatrensis Merr.
- Erycibe terminaliflora Elmer
- Erycibe timorensis Hallier f. ex Hoogland
- Erycibe tixieri Deroin
- Erycibe tomentosa Blume
- Erycibe villosa Forman
- Erycibe zippelii Hoogland
