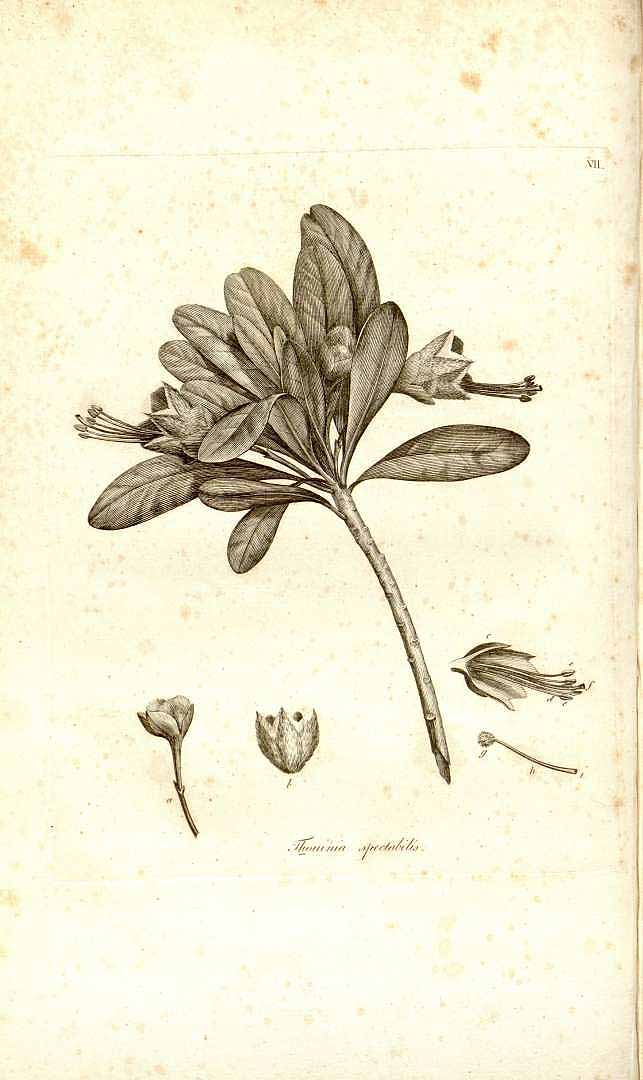
- Illustration by J.E. Smith from Plantarum icones hactenus ineditae, vol. 1: t. 7 (between 1789 and 1791)

Scientific classification
- Kingdom: Plantae
- Clade: Tracheophytes
- Clade: Angiosperms
- Clade: Eudicots
- Clade: Asterids
- Order: Solanales
- Family: Convolvulaceae
- Genus: Humbertia; Lam.
- Species: H. madagascariensis

Binomial name
- Humbertia madagascariensis Lam.

Synonyms
- Endrachium madagascariense (Lam.) J.F.Gmel.; Humbertia aeviternia Comm. ex Lam.; Smithia thouinia J.F.Gmel.; Thouinia spectabilis Sm.

= Humbertia =

Genus of plants

Humbertia is a monotypic genus of flowering plants belonging to the family Convolvulaceae (morning glory family). It only contains one species, Humbertia madagascariensis Lam. It is native to Madagascar. It is known in French as bois de fer; it is endemic to southeastern Madagascar where it occurs in humid evergreen forests at altitudes up to about 600 m (2,000 ft).

The genus name (Humbertia) is in honour of Philibert Commerson (1727–1773), a French naturalist, best known for accompanying Louis Antoine de Bougainville on his voyage of circumnavigation in 1766–1769. The Latin specific epithet, madagascariensis, means coming from Madagascar. Both genus and species were first described and published by Jean-Baptiste Lamarck in Encycl. Vol.2 on page 356 in 1786.

== Description ==
Humbertia madagascariensis forms a medium-sized tree up to 30 m (100 ft) tall. The trunk often has small buttresses and is straight and cylindrical, up to 200 cm (6.6 ft) in diameter. The outer bark is greyish-brown, with fine cracks, and the inner bark has whitish bands. The twigs bear prominent leaf scars and are covered in reddish hairs when young. The leathery, hairless leaves grow at the tips of the twigs and have short stalks. They are up to 10 cm (4 in) long, obovate, with entire margins, cuneate bases and notched or obtuse apexes. The small flowers have parts in fives and grow in the axils of the leaves, either singly or in small groups. The petals are creamy-white and hairy on the outside with membranous edges. The stamens and pistil project in a boss and are more than twice as long as the corolla. The fruit is a slightly fleshy brown berry containing one or two seeds.

== Ecology ==
The lowland forest in the east of Madagascar where this tree is found includes such characteristic species as Myristicaceae, Anthostema, Protium, Allantospermum, Magnistipula, Chaetocarpus, Tsebona macrantha, Perriera and Dialyceras. The birds living in this evergreen woodland include the brown mesite, the Madagascar serpent eagle, the scaly ground roller, the dusky tetraka, the red-tailed newtonia, the helmet vanga and the Bernier's vanga.

== Human uses ==
The timber — known as endranendrana or fantsinakoho — is extremely dense, hard, and durable, making it well-suited for heavy construction work, especially where it will be exposed to wet conditions. It can also be used for parquet flooring, sculptures, turning, mine props, railway sleepers, and agricultural implements. However, the tree has a limited range and has become rare, and is therefore in need of further research and protection.

A sesquiterpene alcohol of a new type has been isolated from the heartwood of the tree, and the class of sesquiterpenes of this type has been given the name humbertiol.
