= Cladostigma =

Scientific classification
- Kingdom: Plantae
- Clade: Tracheophytes
- Clade: Angiosperms
- Clade: Eudicots
- Clade: Asterids
- Order: Solanales
- Family: Convolvulaceae
- Genus: Cladostigma; Radlk.

Genus of flowering plants

Cladostigma is a genus of flowering plants belonging to the family Convolvulaceae.

Its native range is Northeastern & Eastern Tropical Africa, Southwestern Arabian Peninsula.

Species:

- Cladostigma dioicum Radlk.
- Cladostigma hildebrandtioides Hallier f.
- Cladostigma nigistiae Sebsebe
