= Lysiostyles =

Scientific classification
- Kingdom: Plantae
- Clade: Tracheophytes
- Clade: Angiosperms
- Clade: Eudicots
- Clade: Asterids
- Order: Solanales
- Family: Convolvulaceae
- Genus: Lysiostyles; Benth.
- Species: L. scandens

Binomial name
- Lysiostyles scandens Benth.

Genus of plants

Lysiostyles is a monotypic genus of flowering plants belonging to the family Convolvulaceae. The only species is Lysiostyles scandens.

Its native range is Northern South America to Northern Brazil.
