= Tridynamia =

Scientific classification
- Kingdom: Plantae
- Clade: Tracheophytes
- Clade: Angiosperms
- Clade: Eudicots
- Clade: Asterids
- Order: Solanales
- Family: Convolvulaceae
- Genus: Tridynamia; Gagnep.

Genus of flowering plants

Tridynamia is a genus of flowering plants belonging to the family Convolvulaceae.

Its native range is Assam to China and Malaysian Peninsula.

Species:

- Tridynamia bialata (Kerr) Staples
- Tridynamia megalantha (Merr.) Staples
- Tridynamia sinensis (Hemsl.) Staples
- Tridynamia spectabilis (Kurz) Parmar
