= Itzaea =

Scientific classification
- Kingdom: Plantae
- Clade: Tracheophytes
- Clade: Angiosperms
- Clade: Eudicots
- Clade: Asterids
- Order: Solanales
- Family: Convolvulaceae
- Genus: Itzaea; Standl. & Steyerm.
- Species: I. sericea

Binomial name
- Itzaea sericea (Standl.) Standl. & Steyerm.

Genus of flowering plants

Itzaea is a monotypic genus of flowering plants belonging to the family Convolvulaceae. The only species is Itzaea sericea. It was first published in the Field Museum of Natural History Botanical Series in 1944.

Its native range is Southern Mexico to Central America.
