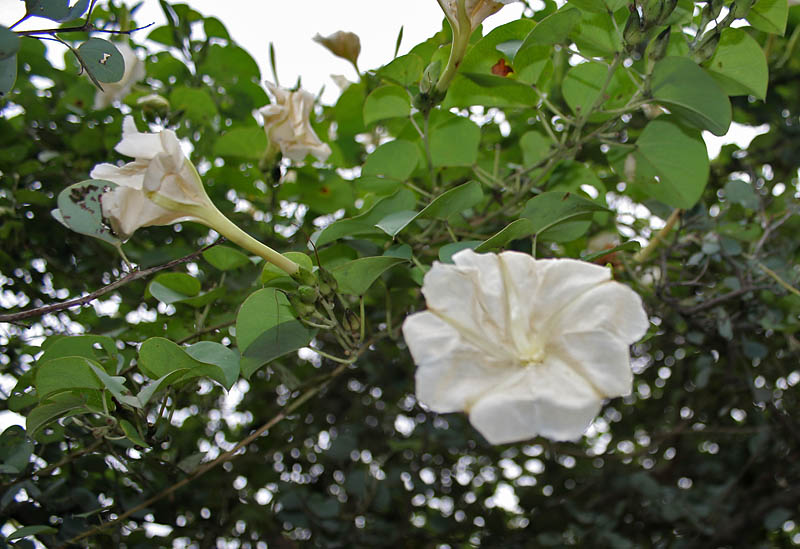
- Rivea hypocrateriformis

Scientific classification
- Kingdom: Plantae
- Clade: Tracheophytes
- Clade: Angiosperms
- Clade: Eudicots
- Clade: Asterids
- Order: Solanales
- Family: Convolvulaceae
- Tribe: Ipomoeeae
- Genus: Rivea; Choisy

Type species
- Rivea hypocrateriformis (Desr.) Choisy

Species
- See text

= Rivea =

Genus of bindweeds

Rivea is a genus of plants in the bindweed family Convolvulaceae.

The following species are recognised in the genus Rivea:

- Rivea hypocrateriformis (Desr.) Choisy
- Rivea ornata (Roxb.) Choisy
- Rivea wightiana R.R.Mill
