= Hyalocystis =

Scientific classification
- Kingdom: Plantae
- Clade: Tracheophytes
- Clade: Angiosperms
- Clade: Eudicots
- Clade: Asterids
- Order: Solanales
- Family: Convolvulaceae
- Genus: Hyalocystis; Hallier f.

Genus of plants

Hyalocystis is a genus of flowering plants belonging to the family Convolvulaceae.

Its native range is Northeastern Tropical Africa.

Species:

- Hyalocystis popovii Verdc.
- Hyalocystis viscosa Hallier f.
