= Tetralocularia =

Scientific classification
- Kingdom: Plantae
- Clade: Tracheophytes
- Clade: Angiosperms
- Clade: Eudicots
- Clade: Asterids
- Order: Solanales
- Family: Convolvulaceae
- Genus: Tetralocularia; O'Donell

Genus of flowering plants

Tetralocularia is a genus of flowering plants belonging to the family Convolvulaceae.

Its native range is Southern Tropical America.

Species:

- Tetralocularia pennellii O'Donell
