= Neuropeltopsis =

Scientific classification
- Kingdom: Plantae
- Clade: Tracheophytes
- Clade: Angiosperms
- Clade: Eudicots
- Clade: Asterids
- Order: Solanales
- Family: Convolvulaceae
- Genus: Neuropeltopsis; Ooststr.
- Species: N. alba

Binomial name
- Neuropeltopsis alba Ooststr.

Genus of plants

Neuropeltopsis is a monotypic genus of flowering plants belonging to the family Convolvulaceae. The only species is Neuropeltopsis alba.

Its native range is Borneo.
