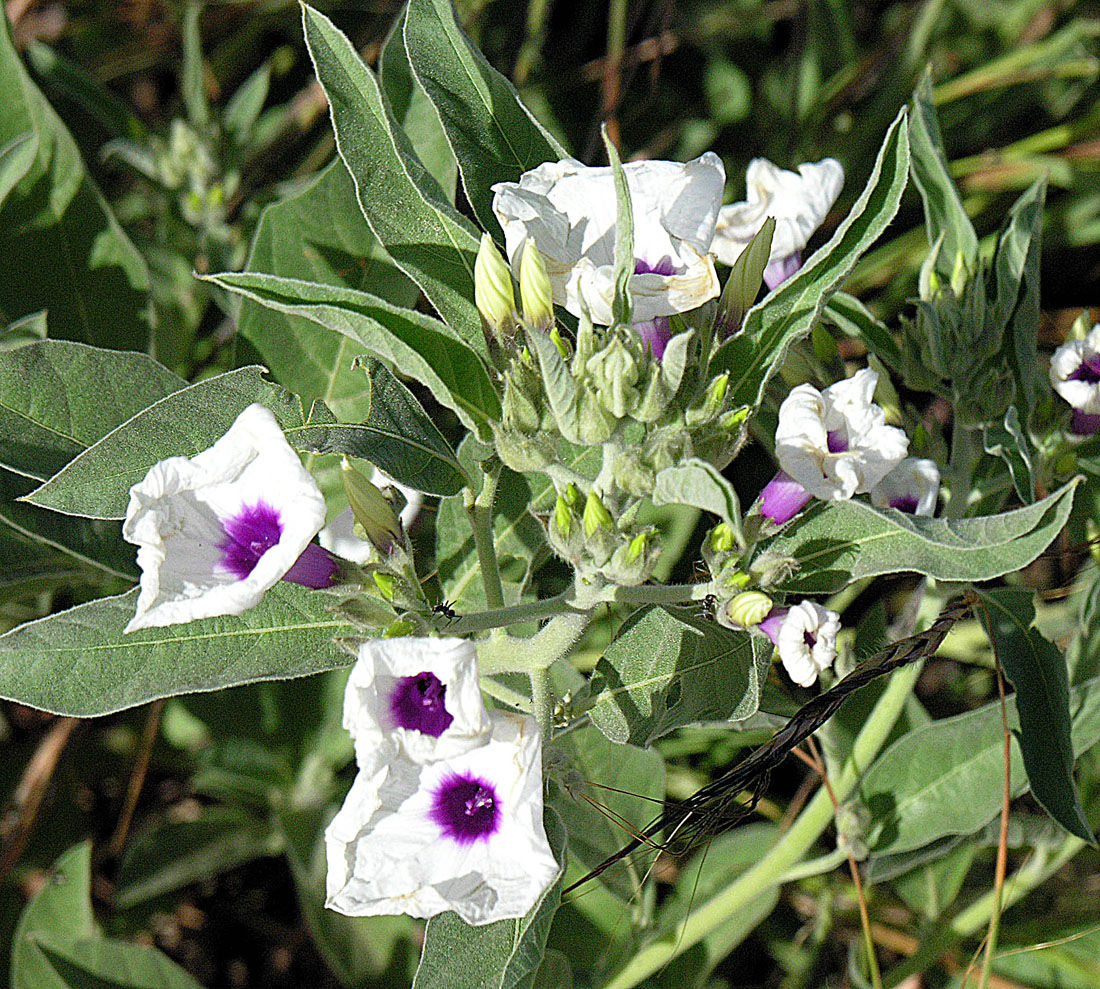
- Astripomoea hyoscyamoides in Tanzania

Scientific classification
- Kingdom: Plantae
- Clade: Tracheophytes
- Clade: Angiosperms
- Clade: Eudicots
- Clade: Asterids
- Order: Solanales
- Family: Convolvulaceae
- Genus: Astripomoea; A.Meeuse

= Astripomoea =

Genus of flowering plants

Astripomoea is a genus of flowering plants belonging to the family Convolvulaceae.

Its native range is Tropical and Southern Africa, Arabian Peninsula.

Species:

- Astripomoea cephalantha (Hallier f.) Verdc.
- Astripomoea delamereana (Rendle) Verdc.
- Astripomoea grantii (Rendle) Verdc.
- Astripomoea hyoscyamoides (Vatke) Verdc.
- Astripomoea lachnosperma (Choisy) A.Meeuse
- Astripomoea longituba Verdc.
- Astripomoea malvacea (Klotzsch) A.Meeuse
- Astripomoea nogalensis (Chiov.) Verdc.
- Astripomoea polycephala (Hallier f.) Verdc.
- Astripomoea procera Thulin
- Astripomoea rotundata (Pilg.) A.Meeuse
- Astripomoea tubiflora (Hallier f.) Verdc.
