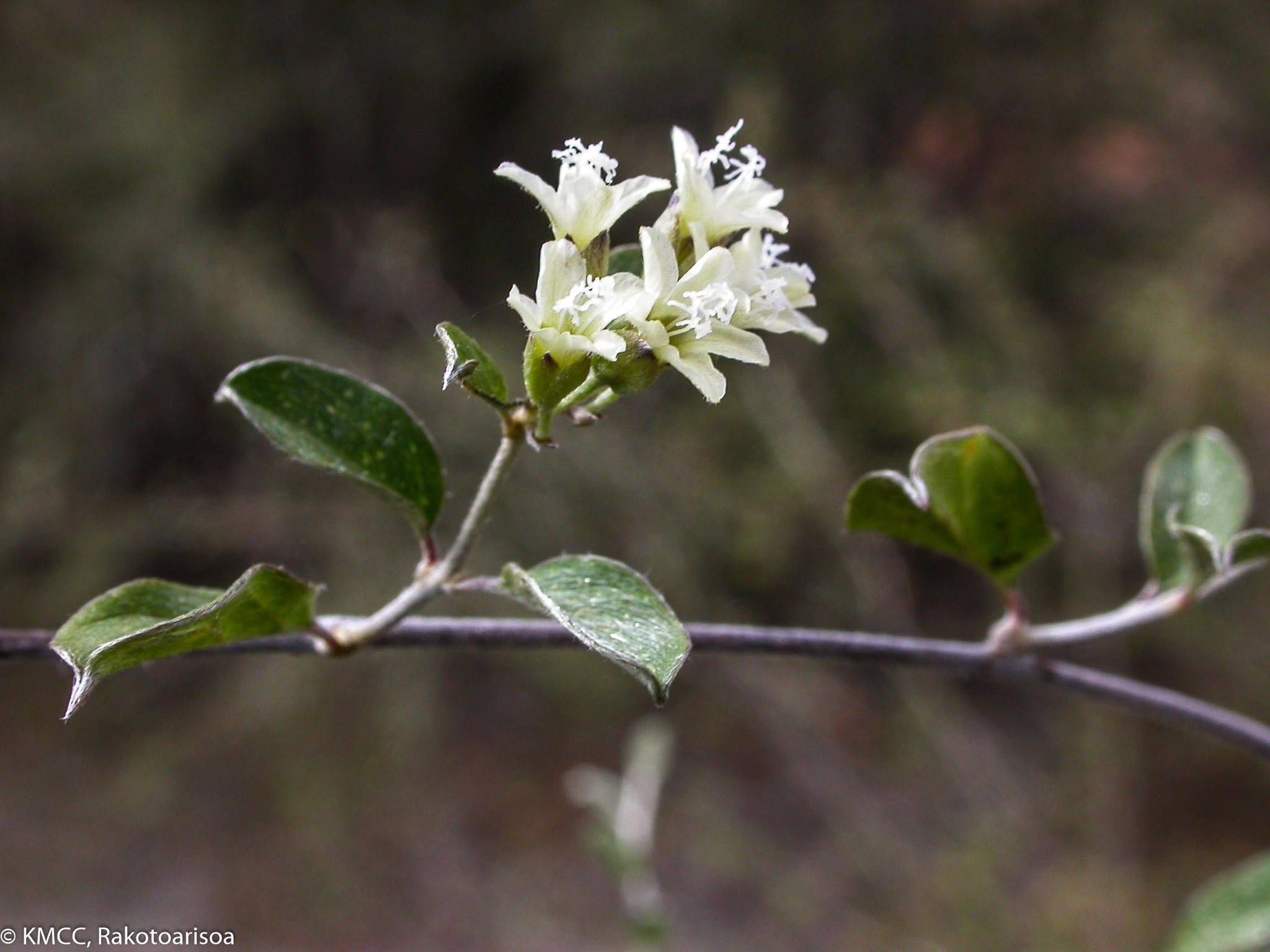
- Hildebrandtia valo

Scientific classification
- Kingdom: Plantae
- Clade: Tracheophytes
- Clade: Angiosperms
- Clade: Eudicots
- Clade: Asterids
- Order: Solanales
- Family: Convolvulaceae
- Tribe: Cresseae
- Genus: Hildebrandtia; Vatke

= Hildebrandtia (plant) =

Genus of flowering plants

Hildebrandtia is a genus of plants in the bindweed family Convolvulaceae.

== Species ==
The following species are recognised in the genus Hildebrandtia:

- Hildebrandtia africana
- Hildebrandtia aloysii
- Hildebrandtia austinii
- Hildebrandtia diredawaensis
- Hildebrandtia linearifolia
- Hildebrandtia obcordata
- Hildebrandtia promontorii
- Hildebrandtia sepalosa
- Hildebrandtia sericea
- Hildebrandtia somalensis
- Hildebrandtia valo
