= Neuropeltis =

Scientific classification
- Kingdom: Plantae
- Clade: Tracheophytes
- Clade: Angiosperms
- Clade: Eudicots
- Clade: Asterids
- Order: Solanales
- Family: Convolvulaceae
- Genus: Neuropeltis; Wall.

Genus of plants

Neuropeltis is a genus of flowering plants belonging to the family Convolvulaceae.

Its native range is Western Tropical Africa to Angola, India to Southern Central China and Western Malesia.

Species:

- Neuropeltis acuminata (P.Beauv.) Benth.
- Neuropeltis aenea R.D.Good
- Neuropeltis alnifolia Lejoly & Lisowski
- Neuropeltis eladii Breteler
- Neuropeltis incompta R.D.Good
- Neuropeltis indochinensis Ooststr.
- Neuropeltis laxiflora Lejoly & Lisowski
- Neuropeltis maingayi Peter ex Ooststr.
- Neuropeltis malabarica Ooststr.
- Neuropeltis occidentalis Breteler
- Neuropeltis prevosteoides Mangenot
- Neuropeltis pseudovelutina Lejoly & Lisowski
- Neuropeltis racemosa Wall.
- Neuropeltis velutina Hallier f.
