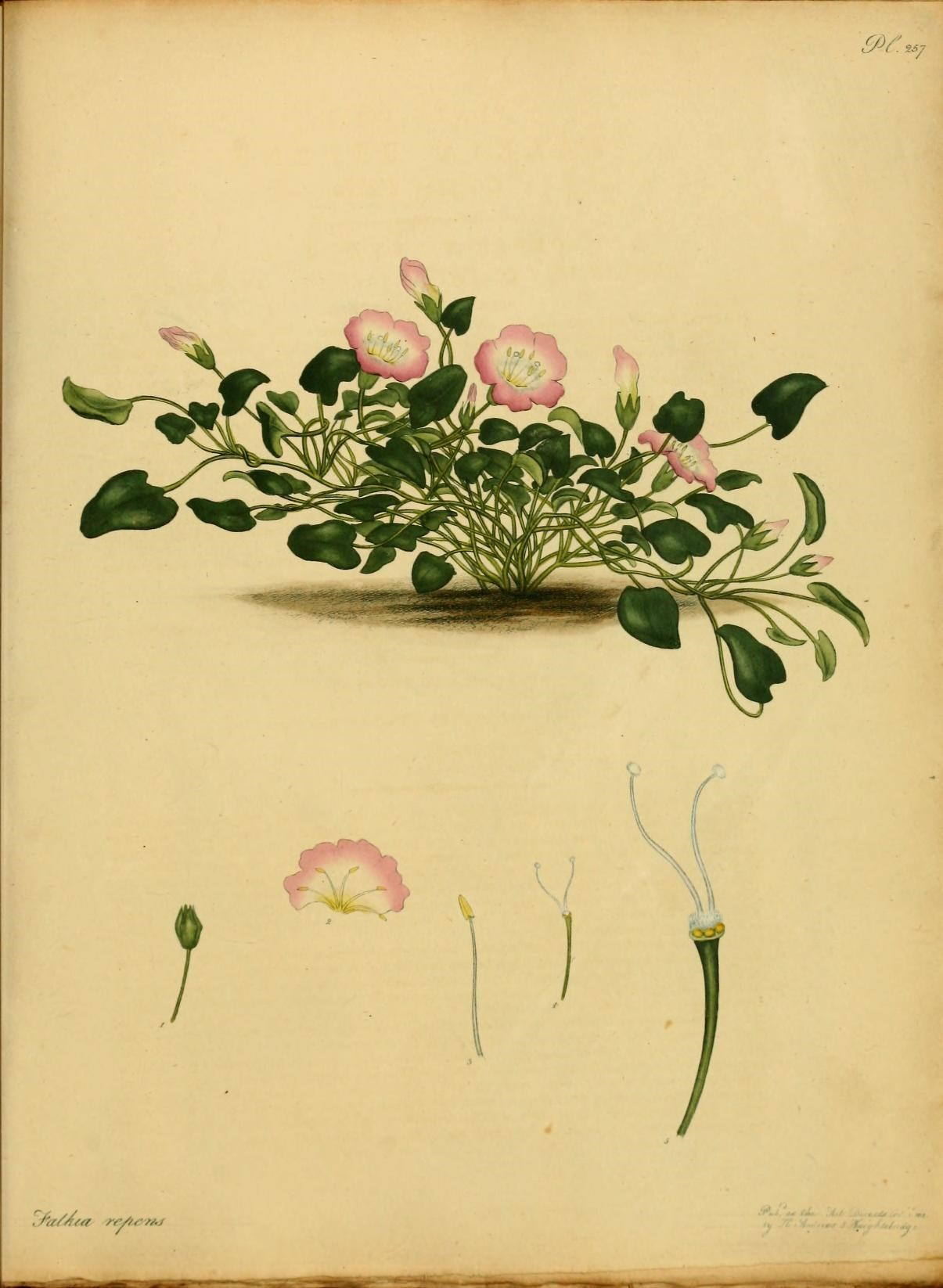
- Falkia repens botanical illustration

Scientific classification
- Kingdom: Plantae
- Clade: Tracheophytes
- Clade: Angiosperms
- Clade: Eudicots
- Clade: Asterids
- Order: Solanales
- Family: Convolvulaceae
- Tribe: Dichondreae
- Genus: Falkia; Thunb.

Species
- See text

= Falkia =

Genus of Convolvulaceae plants

Falkia is a genus of flowering plants in the family Convolvulaceae, native to southern Africa, eastern Africa, and the Arabian Peninsula. They are creeping perennial herbs.

== Species ==
Currently accepted species include:

- Falkia canescens C.H.Wright
- Falkia oblonga Bernh.
- Falkia repens Thunb.
