= Nephrophyllum =

Scientific classification
- Kingdom: Plantae
- Clade: Tracheophytes
- Clade: Angiosperms
- Clade: Eudicots
- Clade: Asterids
- Order: Solanales
- Family: Convolvulaceae
- Genus: Nephrophyllum; A.Rich.
- Species: N. abyssinicum

Binomial name
- Nephrophyllum abyssinicum A.Rich.

Genus of flowering plants

Nephrophyllum is a monotypic genus of flowering plants belonging to the family Convolvulaceae. The only species is Nephrophyllum abyssinicum.

Its native range is Northeastern Tropical Africa.
