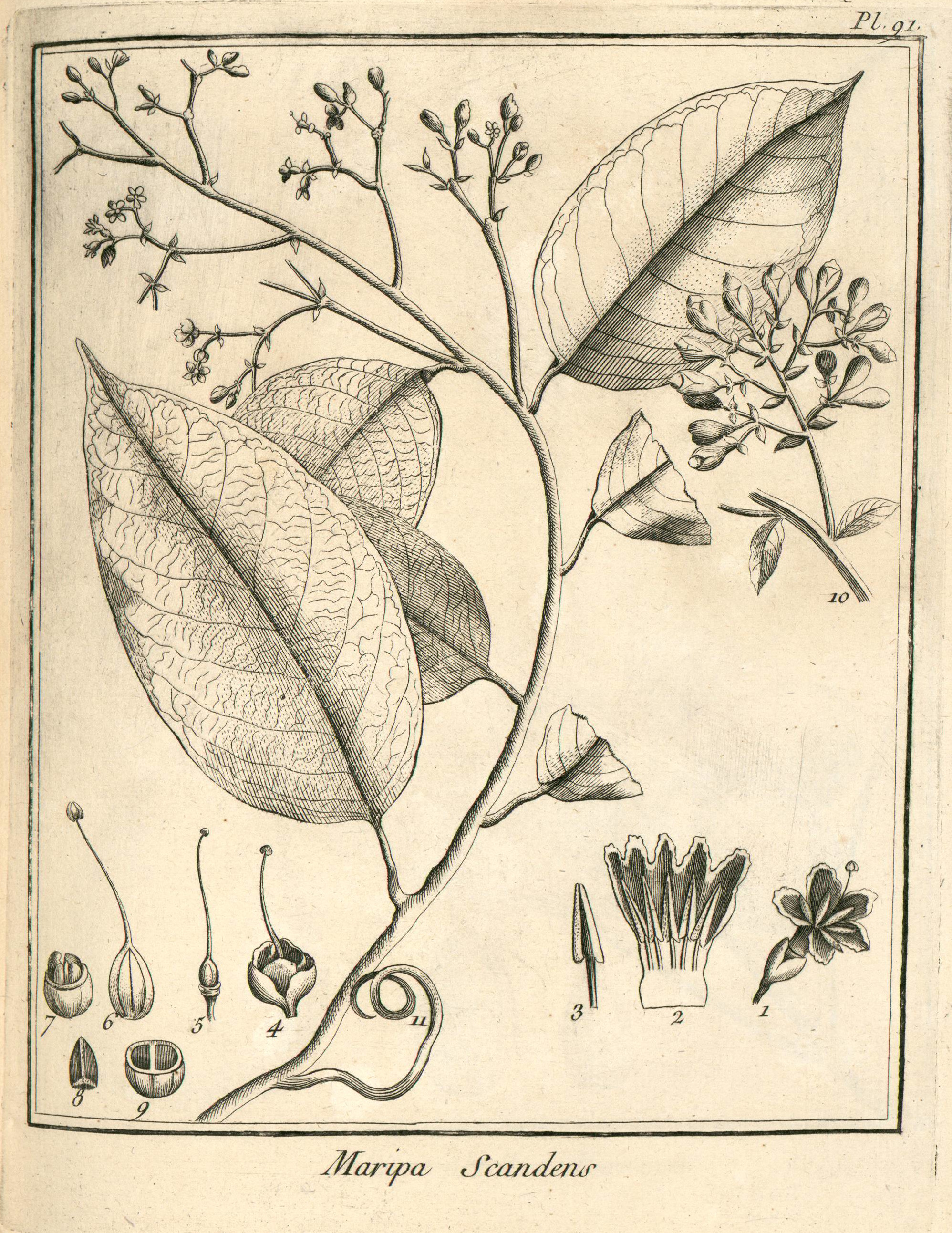

Scientific classification
- Kingdom: Plantae
- Clade: Tracheophytes
- Clade: Angiosperms
- Clade: Eudicots
- Clade: Asterids
- Order: Solanales
- Family: Convolvulaceae
- Genus: Maripa; Aubl.

= Maripa (plant) =

Genus of flowering plants

Maripa is a genus of flowering plants belonging to the family Convolvulaceae.

Its native range is Southeastern Mexico to Southern Tropical America.

Species:

- Maripa axilliflora Mart. ex Meisn.
- Maripa densiflora Benth.
- Maripa elongata Ducke
- Maripa fasciculata Ooststr.
- Maripa glabra Choisy
- Maripa janusiana D.F.Austin
- Maripa lewisii D.F.Austin
- Maripa longifolia Sagot ex Hallier f.
- Maripa nicaraguensis Hemsl.
- Maripa panamensis Hemsl.
- Maripa paniculata Barb.Rodr.
- Maripa pauciflora D.F.Austin
- Maripa peruviana Ooststr.
- Maripa putumayana D.F.Austin
- Maripa repens Rusby
- Maripa reticulata Ducke
- Maripa scandens Aubl.
- Maripa stellulata Steyerm.
- Maripa violacea (Aubl.) Ooststr. ex Lanj. & Uittien
- Maripa williamsii Ooststr.
