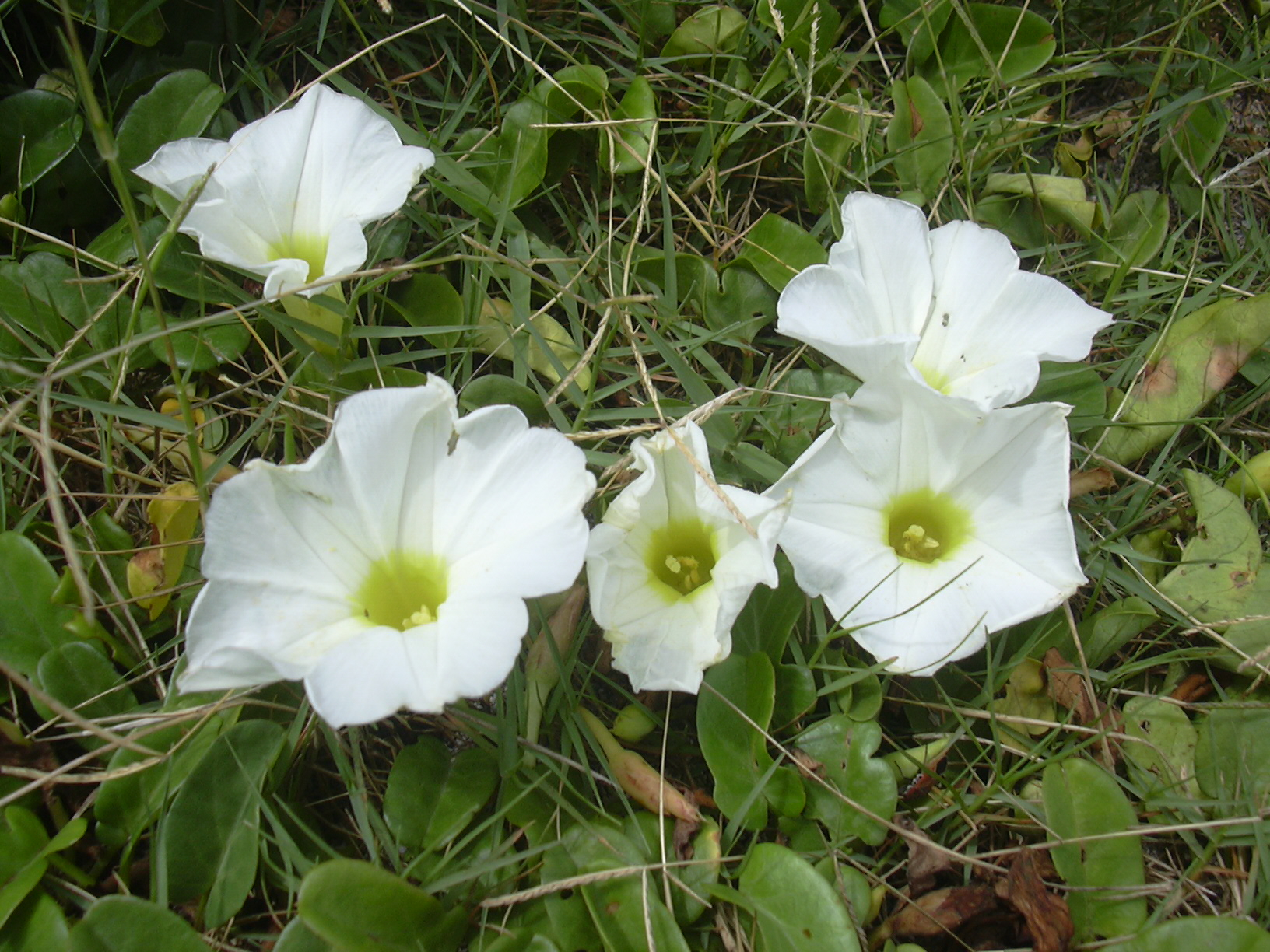
- Ipomoea imperati

Scientific classification
- Kingdom: Plantae
- Clade: Tracheophytes
- Clade: Angiosperms
- Clade: Eudicots
- Clade: Asterids
- Order: Solanales
- Family: Convolvulaceae; Juss.

Type genus
- Convolvulus L.

Genera
- See text

= Convolvulaceae =

Bindweed family

Family of flowering plants

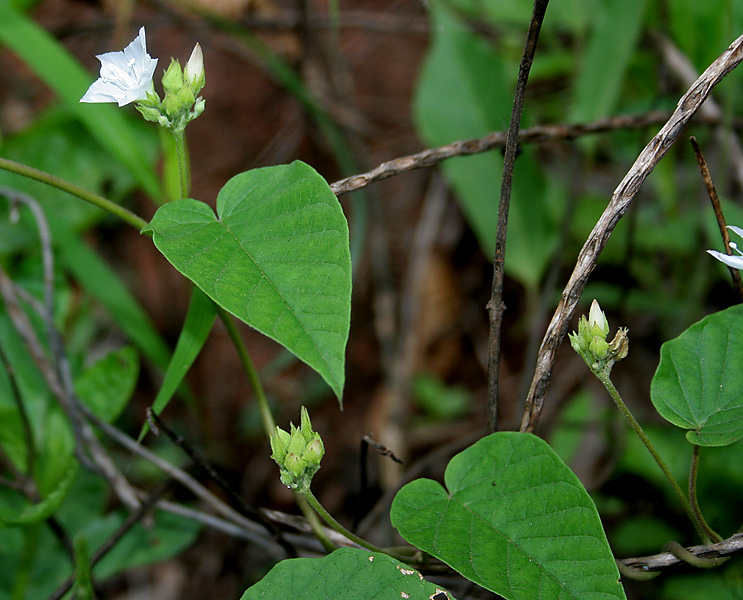
Jacquemontia paniculata

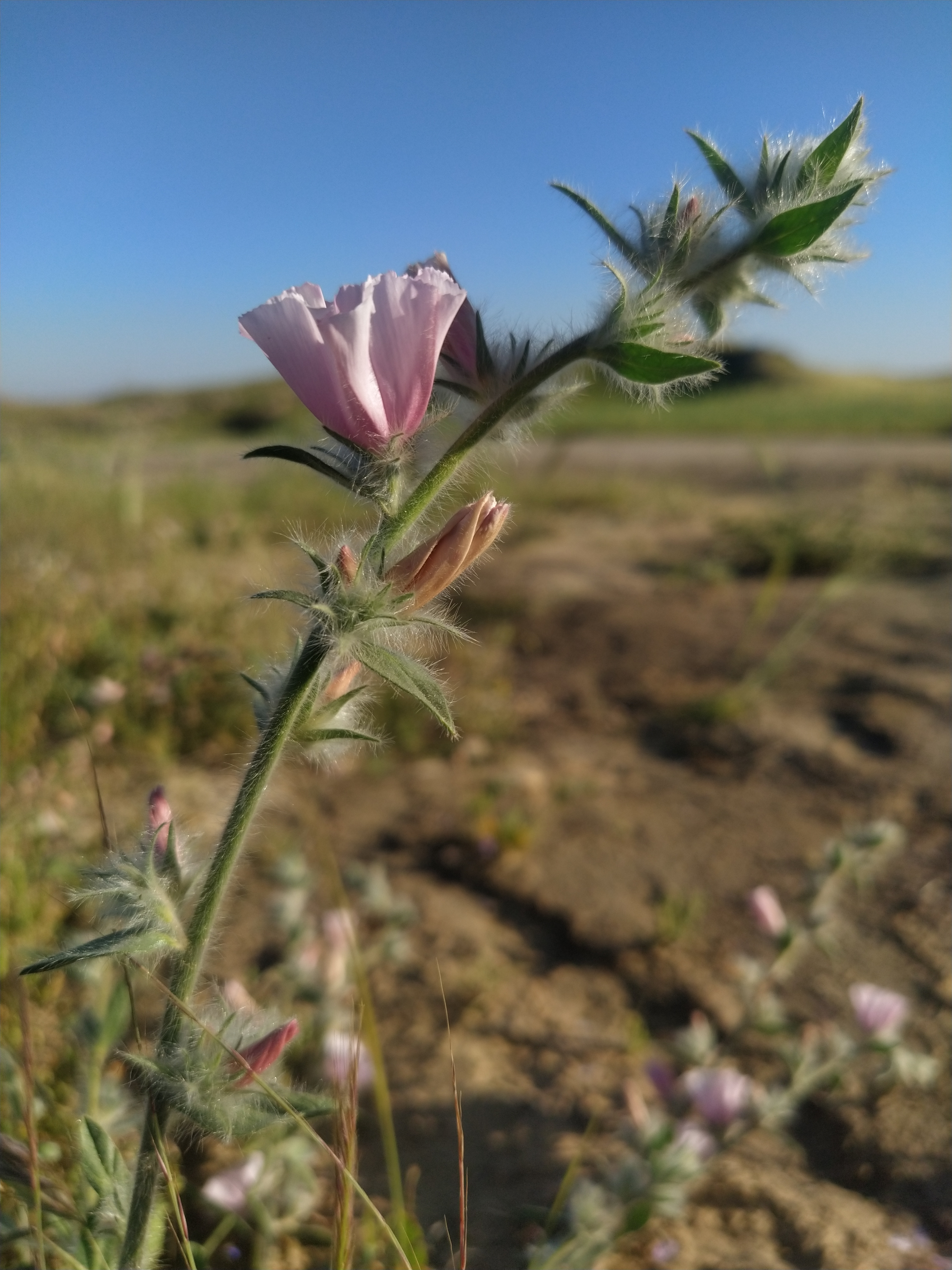
Convolvulus cephalopodus in Behbahan

Convolvulaceae (/kənˌvɒlvjəˈleɪsi.iː, -aɪ/), commonly called the bindweeds or morning glories, is a family of about 60 genera and more than 1,650 species. These species are primarily herbaceous vines, but also include trees, shrubs and herbs. The tubers of several species are edible, the best known of which is the sweet potato.

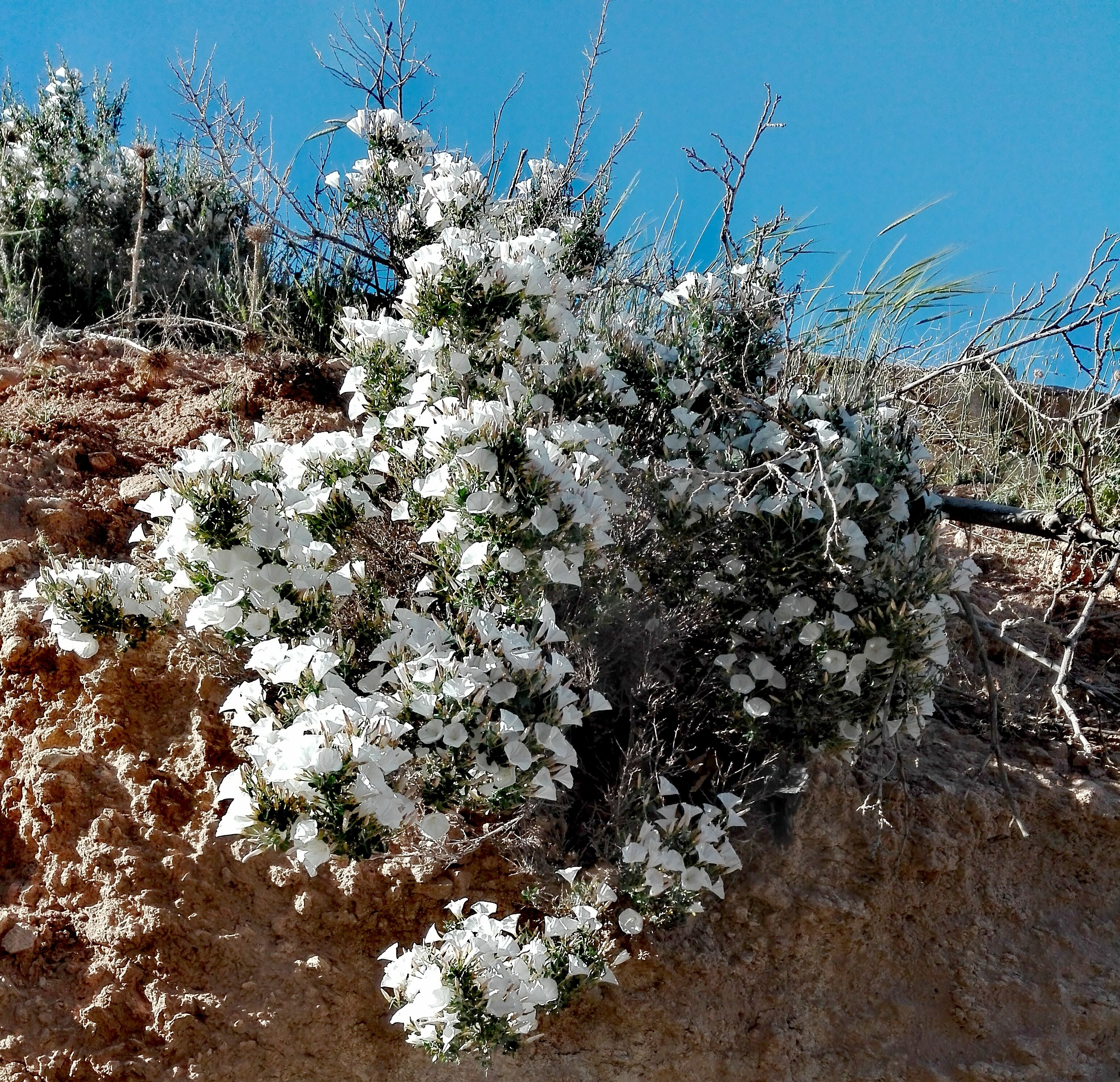
Convolvulus leiocalycinus

== Description ==
Convolvulaceae can be recognized by their funnel-shaped, radially symmetrical corolla; the floral formula for the family has five sepals, five fused petals, five epipetalous stamens (stamens fused to the petals), and a two-part syncarpous and superior gynoecium. The stems of these plants are usually winding, hence their Latin name (from convolvere, "to wind"). The leaves are simple and alternate, without stipules. In parasitic Cuscuta (dodder) they are reduced to scales. The fruit can be a capsule, berry, or nut, all containing only two seeds per one locule (one ovule/ovary).

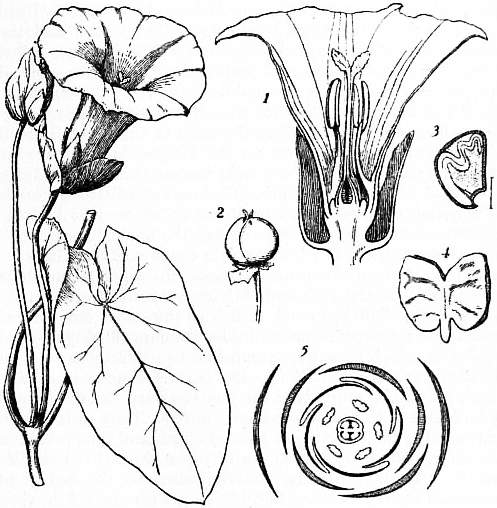
Convolvulus sepium, slightly reduced.

The leaves and starchy, tuberous roots of some species are used as foodstuffs (e.g. sweet potato and water spinach), and the seeds are exploited for their medicinal value as purgatives. Some species contain ergoline alkaloids that are likely responsible for the use of these species as ingredients in psychedelic drugs (e.g. ololiuhqui). The presence of ergolines in some species of this family is due to infection by fungi related to the ergot fungi of the genus Claviceps. A recent study of Convolvulaceae species, Ipomoea asarifolia, and its associated fungi showed the presence of a fungus, identified by DNA sequencing of 18s and ITS ribosomal DNA and phylogenetic analysis to be closely related to fungi in the family Clavicipitaceae, was always associated with the presence of ergoline alkaloids in the plant. The identified fungus appears to be a seed-transmitted, obligate biotroph growing epiphytically on its host. This finding strongly suggests the unique presence of ergoline alkaloids in some species of the family Convolvulaceae is due to symbiosis with clavicipitaceous fungi. Moreover, another group of compounds, loline alkaloids, commonly produced by some members of the clavicipitaceous fungi (genus Neotyphodium), has been identified in a convolvulaceous species, but the origin of the loline alkaloids in this species is unknown.

Members of the family are well known as food plants (e.g. sweet potatoes and water spinach), as showy garden plants (e.g. morning glory) and as troublesome weeds (e.g. bindweed (mainly Convolvulus and Calystegia) and dodder), while Humbertia madagascariensis is a medium-sized tree and Ipomoea carnea is an erect shrub. Some parasitic members of this family are also used medicinally.

== Genera ==
Tribe Aniseieae

- Aniseia Choisy
- Iseia O'Donell
- Odonellia K.R.Robertson
- Tetralocularia O'Donell

Tribe Cardiochlamyeae

- Cardiochlamys Oliv.
- Cordisepalum Verdc.
- Dinetus Buch.-Ham. ex Sweet
- Duperreya Gaudich.
- Poranopsis Roberty
- Tridynamia Gagnep.

Tribe Convolvuleae

- Calystegia R.Br. – Bindweed, morning glory
- Convolvulus L. – bindweed, morning glory
- Polymeria R.Br.

Tribe Cresseae

- Bonamia Thouars
- Cladostigma Radlk.
- Cressa L.
- Evolvulus L.
- Hildebrandtia Vatke
- Itzaea Standl. & Steyerm.
- Neuropeltis Wall.
- Neuropeltopsis Ooststr.
- Sabaudiella Chiov.
- Seddera Hochst.
- Stylisma Raf.
- Wilsonia R. Br.

Tribe Cuscuteae

- Cuscuta L. – dodder

Tribe Dichondreae

- Calycobolus Roem. & Schult.
- Dichondra J.R.Forst. & G.Forst.
- Dipteropeltis Hallier f.
- Falkia Thunb.
- Metaporana N.E.Br.
- Nephrophyllum A.Rich.
- Porana Burm. f.
- Rapona Baill.

Tribe Erycibeae

- Erycibe Roxb.

Tribe Humbertieae

- Humbertia Comm. ex Lam.

Tribe Ipomoeeae

- Argyreia Lour. – Hawaiian baby woodrose
- Astripomoea A.Meeuse
- Ipomoea L. – morning glory, sweet potato
- Lepistemon Blume
- Lepistemonopsis Dammer
- Paralepistemon Lejoly & Lisowski
- Rivea Choisy
- Stictocardia Hallier f.
- Turbina Raf.

Tribe Jacquemontieae

- Jacquemontia Choisy

Tribe Maripeae

- Dicranostyles Benth.
- Lysiostyles Benth.
- Maripa Aubl.

Incertae sedis (formerly Tribe Merremieae)

- Camonea Raf.
- Daustinia Buril & Simões
- Decalobanthus Ooststr.
- Distimake Raf.
- Hewittia Wight & Arn.
- Hyalocystis Hallier f.
- Merremia Dennst. ex Endl. – Hawaiian woodrose
- Operculina Silva Manso
- Remirema Kerr
- Xenostegia D.F.Austin & Staples

== See also ==
- Morning glory (drug) (Convolvulaceae species when used for psychedelic effects)
