= Christmas holly =

List of plants with the same or similar names

Christmas holly is a common name used for two species of plant in the Holly genus:

- Ilex aquifolium, the common European holly native to Europe and North Africa
- Ilex opaca, the American holly native to the eastern United States
