= Tuberous morning glory =

Tuberous morning glory can refer to these plants:

- Ipomoea batatas, also known as sweet potato
- Merremia tuberosa, also known as Spanish arborvine
