= Praefoliation =

Praefoliation refers to the arrangement of parts within an unopened plant bud.

- For the arrangement of leaves within a vegetative bud, see Vernation.
- For the arrangement of flower parts within a flower bud (prefloration), see Aestivation (botany)
