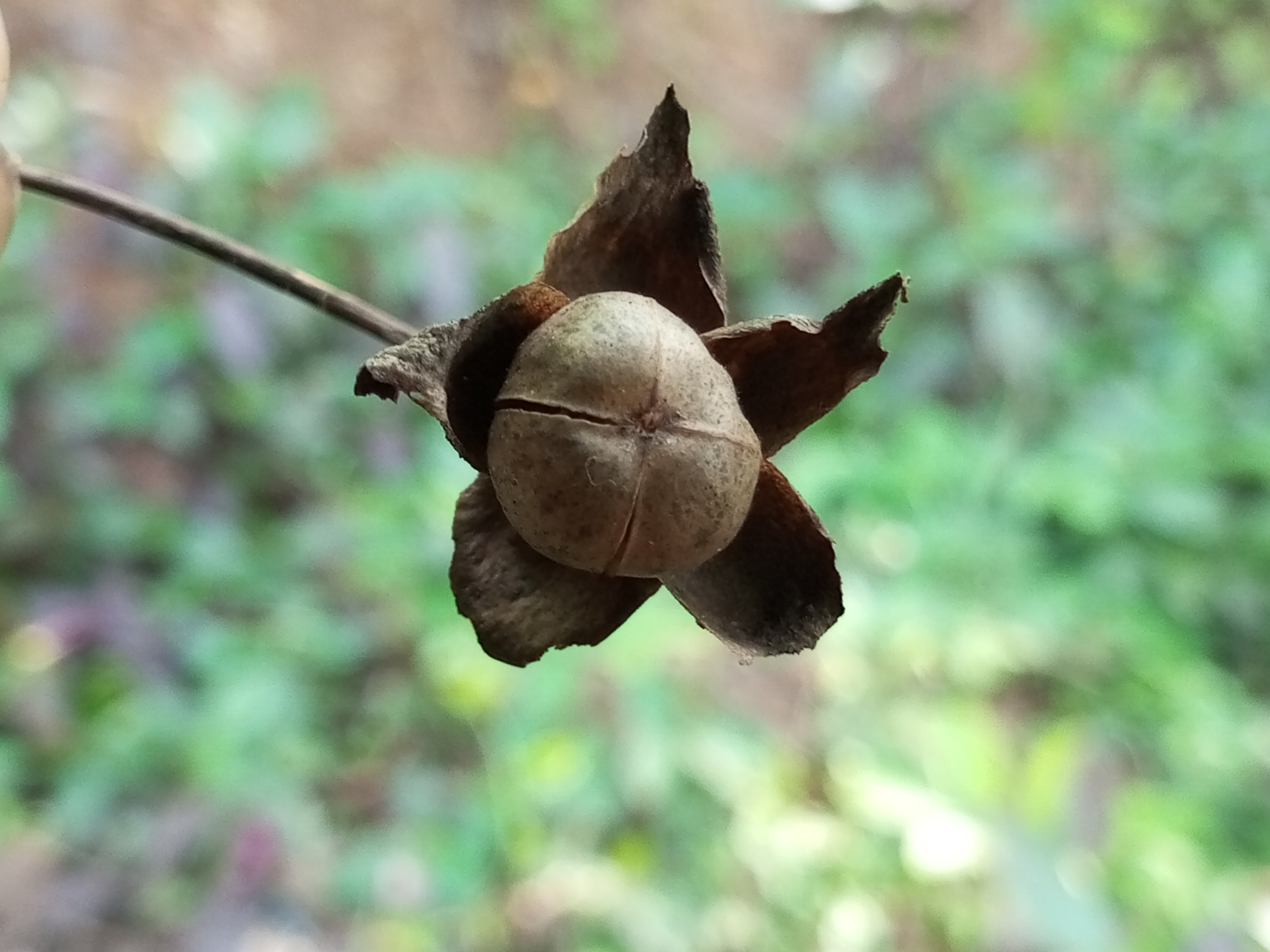
- Camonea vitifolia

Scientific classification
- Kingdom: Plantae
- Clade: Tracheophytes
- Clade: Angiosperms
- Clade: Eudicots
- Clade: Asterids
- Order: Solanales
- Family: Convolvulaceae
- Genus: Camonea; Raf.

= Camonea =

Genus of flowering plants

Camonea is a genus of flowering plants belonging to the family Convolvulaceae.

Its native range is Tropics and Subtropics.

Species:

- Camonea bambusetorum (Kerr) A.R.Simões & Staples
- Camonea kingii (Prain) A.R.Simões & Staples
- Camonea pilosa (Houtt.) A.R.Simões & Staples
- Camonea umbellata (L.) A.R.Simões & Staples
- Camonea vitifolia (Burm.f.) A.R.Simões & Staples
