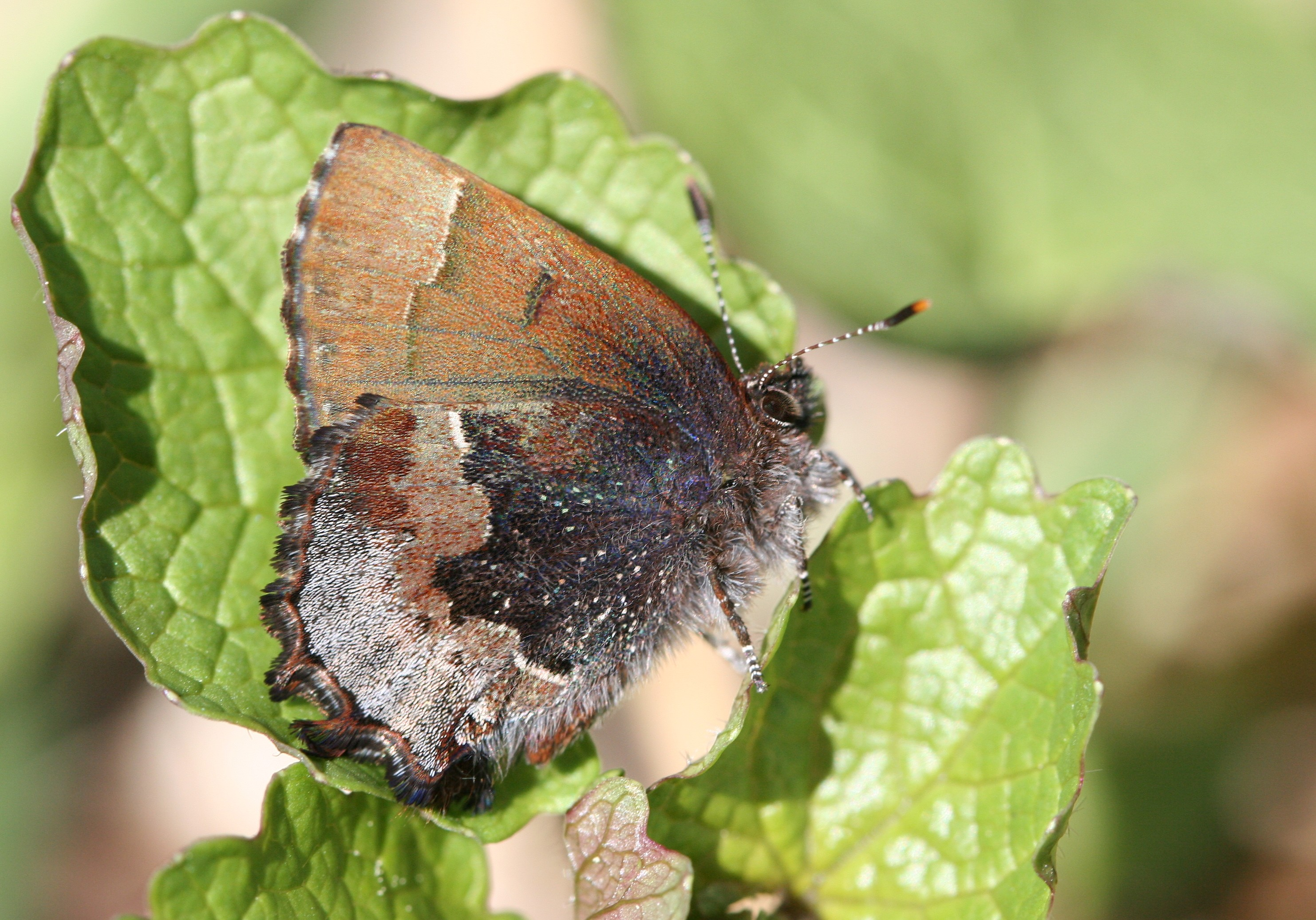

Conservation status
- Secure (NatureServe)

Scientific classification
- Domain: Eukaryota
- Kingdom: Animalia
- Phylum: Arthropoda
- Class: Insecta
- Order: Lepidoptera
- Family: Lycaenidae
- Genus: Callophrys
- Species: C. henrici

Binomial name
- Callophrys henrici (Grote & Robinson, 1819)
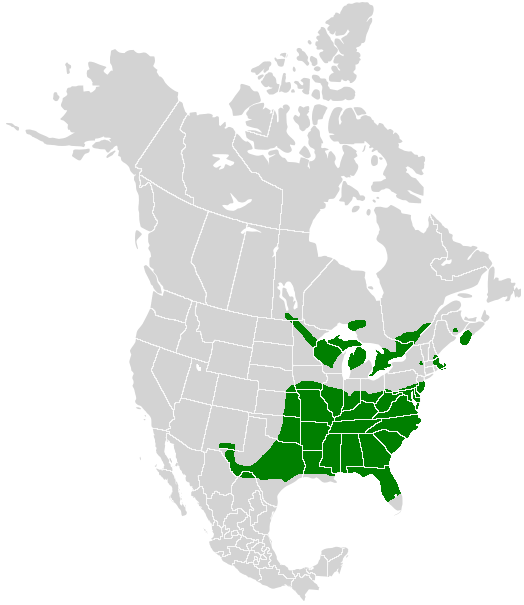

Synonyms
- Incisclia henrici; Deciduphagus henrici

= Callophrys henrici =

Henry's elfin

Species of butterfly

Callophrys henrici, the Henry's elfin or woodland elfin, is a North American butterfly in the family Lycaenidae. In Canada it is found from southern Manitoba to southern Nova Scotia. It has two main groups of populations in the United States; the first is found along the Atlantic Coast and uses various hollies (Ilex) as host plants; and the second is found mainly in the north and the Appalachians where they use redbud (Cercis canadensis) as a host plant. Henry's elfin is increasing in New England because of an introduced buckthorn (Rhamnus cathartica) it now uses as a host plant. It is listed as a species of special concern in the US state of Connecticut.

== Description ==
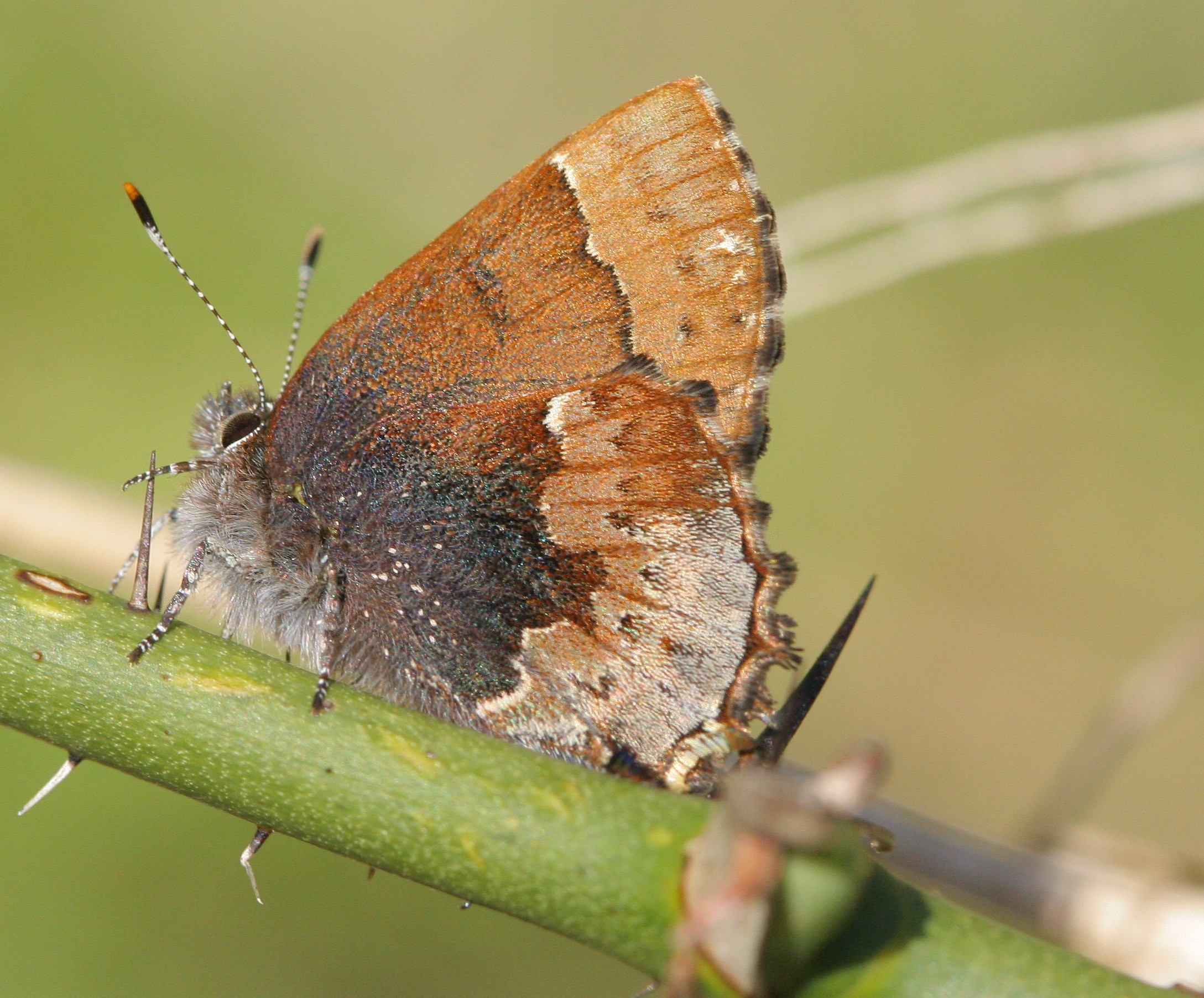

The upperside of the wings is a dark brown color. The underside of the wings is strongly two toned with the basal area being dark brown black. The hindwing postmedian line has white at both ends. The outer edge of the hindwing is frosted and the outer edge of the forewing is sometimes green toned. The hindwing has tails that are short and stubby. In the southeast, these tails are longer. The male lacks a stigma. Henry's elfin's wingspan measures 20 to 25 mm (0.79 to 0.98 in)

== Similar species ==
Similar species in the Henry's elfin's range include the frosted elfin (Callophrys irus), the brown elfin (Callophrys augustinus), and the hoary elfin (Callophrys polios).

The frosted elfin is slightly larger, males have a stigma, the underside of the hindwing has more frosting, and there is usually a dark spot near the hindwing outer margin.

The brown elfin is more reddish brown, males have a stigma, it lacks hindwing tails, and the underside of the hindwing has no frosting.

The hoary elfin is smaller, males have a stigma, it lacks hindwing tails, the underside of the hindwing outer margin is completely frosted, and the forewing outer margin is also frosted.

== Habitat ==
Henry's elfin can be found in a wide range of habitats such as barrens, coastal holly forests, open woodlands, mesquite woodlands, etc.

== Flight ==
This butterfly may be encountered from early May to early June in the north and March to April in the south.

== Life cycle ==
Males perch at about human eye level to await females.(Males will sometimes perch high in tree tops or will perch very low to the ground.) Females lay their eggs singly on the host plant flower buds or on host plant leaves near the buds. The eggs are pale green but turn a whitish color before hatching. The larva is quite variable. It varies from greenish yellow to red brown to maroon. It has subdorsal spots that may be white, yellow, green, or red green and has a lateral stripe which may be yellow or a reddish color. Some individuals have a faint yellow or reddish middorsal stripe. The pupa is orange brown and is mottled with a dark brown-black color. The pupa hibernates in leaf litter. Henry's elfin has one brood per year.

== Host plants ==
Host plants used by Henry's elfin:

- Redbud, Cercis canadensis
- Dahoon holly, Ilex cassine
- American holly, Ilex opaca
- Yaupon holly, Ilex vomitoria
- Black buckthorn, Rhamnus frangula
- Mexican buckeye Ungnadia speciosa
- Vaccinium species
- Viburnum species, including Maple-leaf viburnum, Viburnum acerifolium
