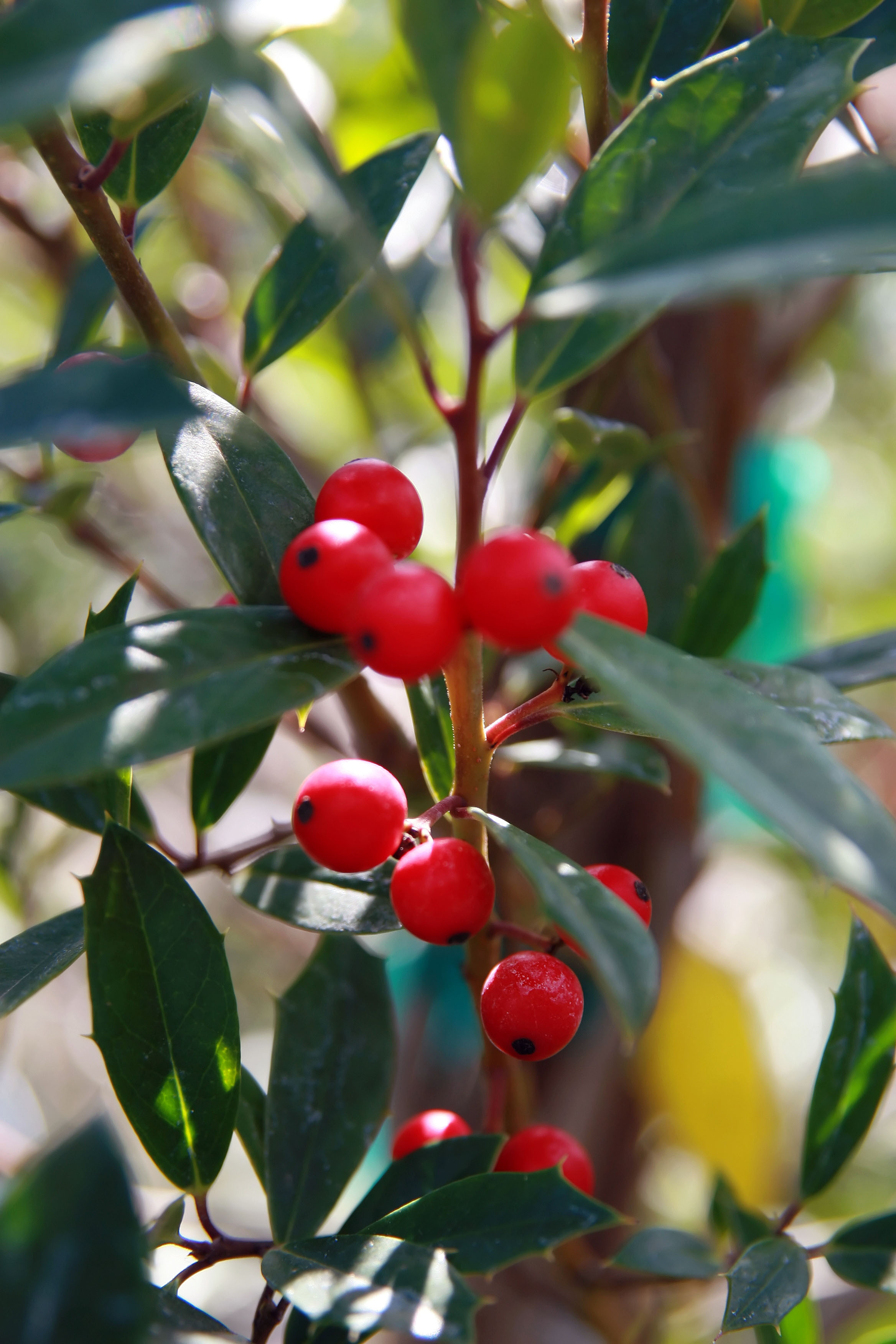
- Ilex × attenuata 'Fosteri'

Scientific classification
- Kingdom: Plantae
- Clade: Tracheophytes
- Clade: Angiosperms
- Clade: Eudicots
- Clade: Asterids
- Order: Aquifoliales
- Family: Aquifoliaceae
- Genus: Ilex
- Species: I. × attenuata

Binomial name
- Ilex × attenuata Ashe

Synonyms
- Ilex × nettletoniana R.H.Ferguson

= Ilex × attenuata =

Hybrid species of flowering plant

Ilex × attenuata, the topal holly, is the result of a cross between Ilex cassine (dahoon) and Ilex opaca (American holly). It is a naturally occurring hybrid found in the southeastern United States where the ranges of the parents overlap, but hybrid cultivars have also been created. The best known cultivars are 'Fosteri', Foster holly, which does not require males to set fruit, and 'Savannah', with very showy red fruit.
