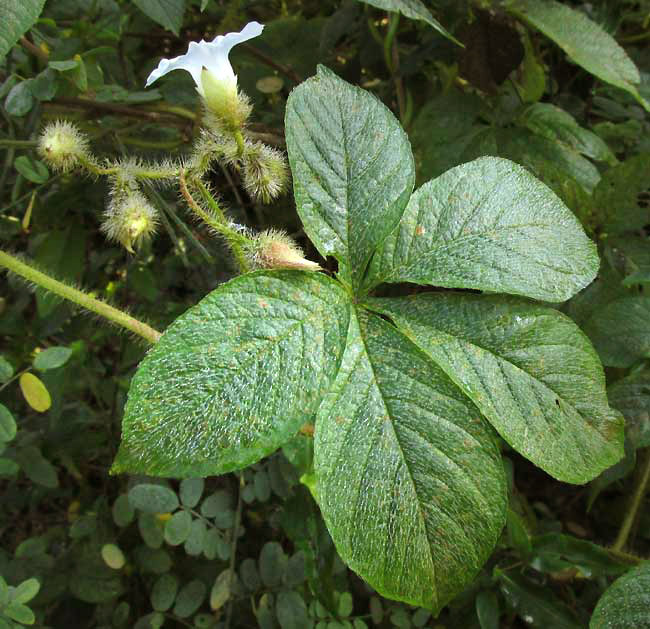

Scientific classification
- Kingdom: Plantae
- Clade: Tracheophytes
- Clade: Angiosperms
- Clade: Eudicots
- Clade: Asterids
- Order: Solanales
- Family: Convolvulaceae
- Genus: Distimake
- Species: D. aegyptius

Binomial name
- Distimake aegyptius (L.) A.R.Simões & Staples (2017)

Synonyms
- See text

= Distimake aegyptius =

Species of flowering plant

Distimake aegyptius, the Egyptian woodrose or hairy wood-rose and other names, is a plant in the family Convolvulaceae. Typical of the family, it is an herbaceous or somewhat woody, perennial, and creeping or twining vine.

== Description ==
A good field mark distinguishing the Egyptian Woodrose from many other morning glory species is its stems' conspicuously long, yellowish, stiff hairs. The compound leaves, consisting of 3-7 leaflets radiating outward from a single point atop of the petiole, bear hairs which lie close to both sides of the leaflets. The leaflets are up to 9cm long (~3½ inches) and 5cm wide (~2 inches). Leaflet margins can bear low teeth, or not.

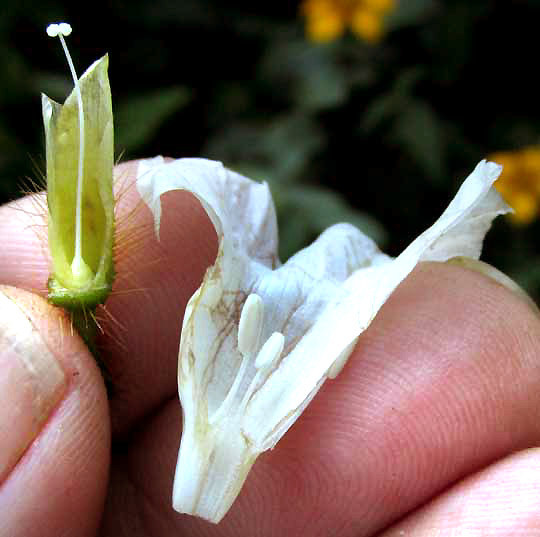
Bisected flower

Inflorescences usually bear only two or three flowers atop hairy peduncles up to 20cm long (~8 inches). The flowers' sepals are of two kinds: The ones closest to the corolla are shorter, hairless or only weakly hairy, and rounded at their tips, while the outer ones are longer, sharp-pointed, with stiff hairs, and their surfaces may be covered with small, nipple-shaped or rounded projections called papillae. The corollas are white, bell-shaped and hairless, up to 3cm long (~1 inch). The hairless capsule-type fruits are more or less spherical, sometimes somewhat quadrangular, and usually produce only one to four, but up to six relatively large, black, hairless seeds a bit triangular in cross section.

== Distribution ==
The iNaturalist map showing locations of observations of Merremia aegyptia indicate that the species occurs nearly throughout the world's tropics, except the drier and high elevation parts, so not in Egypt.

== Habitat ==
Distimake aegyptius grows in disturbed, or "anthropized", environments.

== Human uses ==
Distimake aegyptius is grown as an ornamental and its stems can be used to tie things together. Some livestock graze on the plant, but horses don't. If small livestock eat large quantities, they get diarrhea. In Nigeria the dried leaves are used as a dressing for burns.

A 2024 study of bioactive compounds in stems and seeds of Distimake aegyptius found phytosterol compounds known to possess antioxidant, anti-cancerous, anti-inflammatory, anti-hypercholesterolemic and antidiabetic properties, thus worthy of further study.

== Taxonomy ==
In 1838, when the colorful, self-educated, French outcast and polymath Constantine Samuel Rafinesque first published the genus Distimake in his self-published book Flora Telluriana, he wrote in English ,"This has the corolla of Ipomea and stigmas of Nemostema, type D. glaber Raf. Conv. do Aubl. t. 53 and others." That specimen, the much-traveled author writes, was in Guyana.

In 2017, Ana Rita Simões and George Staples, based on molecular, morphological and palynological evidence, transferred species from the existing genus Davenportia and reassigned certain species from the genus Merremia s.l., to expand Rafinesque's genus Distimake. The former Merremia aegyptius thus became Distimake aegyptius.

The former Merremia aegyptius hadn't always been a Merremia, as the following list of synonyms makes clear:

=== Synonyms ===
These synonyms of Distimake aegyptius were recognized in 2025:

HOMOTYPIC:
- Batatas pentaphylla L. (1834)
- Convolvulus aegyptius (L.) (1759)
- Convolvulus pentaphyllus L. (1762)
- Ipomoea aegyptia L. (1753)
- Ipomoea pentaphylla (1788)
- Merremia aegyptia (L.) Urb. (1910)
- Merremia pentaphylla Hallier f. (1893)
- Operculina aegyptia (L.) House (1906)
- Spiranthera aegyptia (L.) Roberty (1964)
- Spiranthera pentaphylla (L.) Bojer (1837)

HETEROTYPIC:

- Convolvulus aphyllus Viv. (1802)
- Convolvulus coriaceus Choisy (1845)
- Convolvulus cujanensis Bowdich (1825)
- Convolvulus hirsutus Roxb. (1824)
- Convolvulus munitus Wall. ex Wight (1830)
- Convolvulus nemorosus Roem. & Schult. (1819)
- Ipomoea fulva Bertol. (1826)
- Ipomoea nemorosa (Roem. & Schult.) G.Don (1837)
- Ipomoea pilosa Cav. (1797)
- Ipomoea polytricha Sweet (1830)
- Ipomoea sinaloensis Brandegee (1905)
- Ipomoea tortugensis Peter (1891)
- Ipomoea verniciflua G.Don ex Meisn. (1869)
- Merremia aegyptia var. nemorosa R.Knuth (1927)
- Merremia fulva (Bertol.) Manitz (1983)
- Merremia pentaphylla var. nemorosa Hallier f. (1899)
