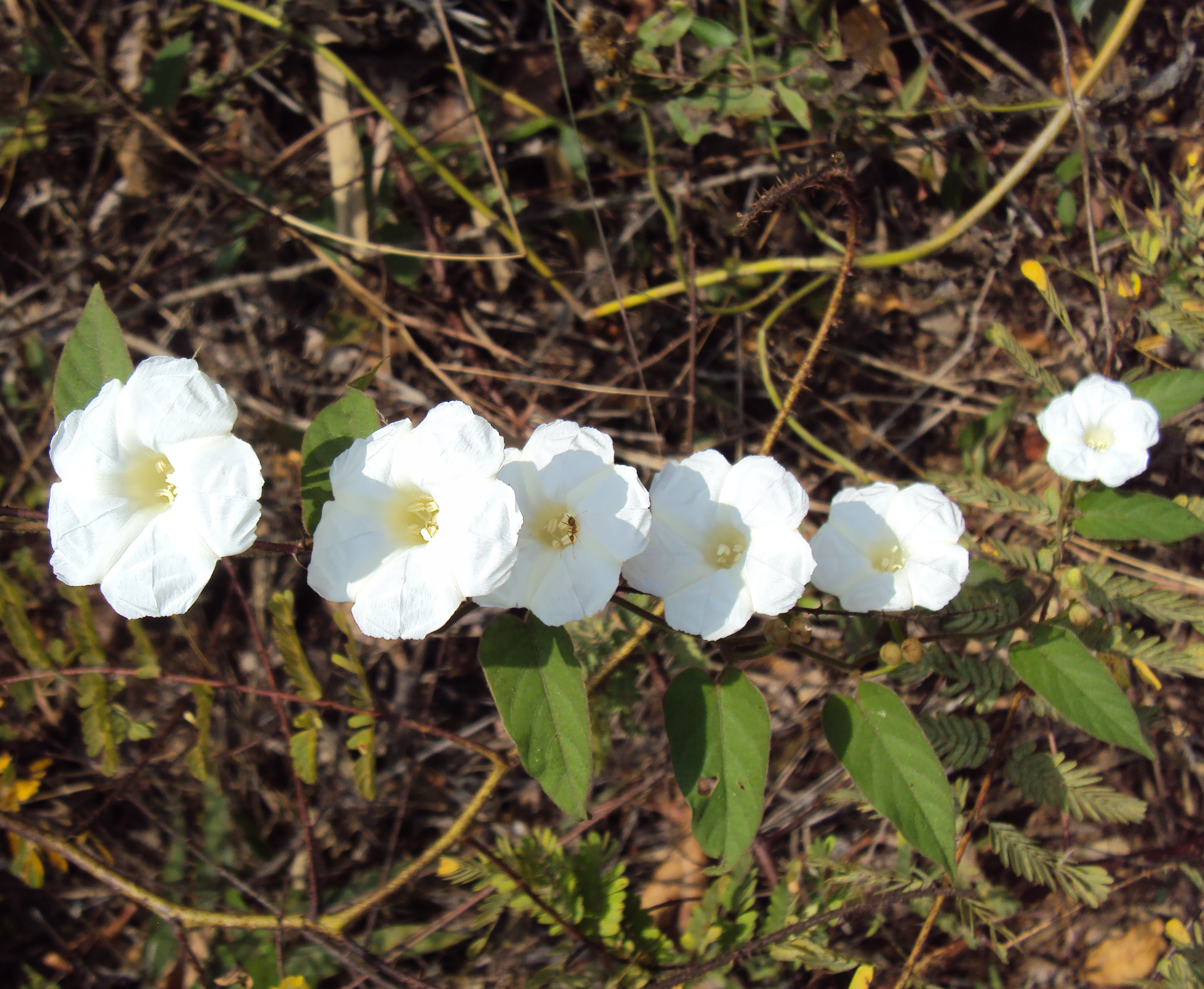

Scientific classification
- Kingdom: Plantae
- Clade: Tracheophytes
- Clade: Angiosperms
- Clade: Eudicots
- Clade: Asterids
- Order: Solanales
- Family: Convolvulaceae
- Genus: Camonea
- Species: C. umbellata

Binomial name
- Camonea umbellata (L.) A.R.Simões & Staples

Synonyms
- List: Camonea bifida (Vahl) Raf.; Convolvulus aristolochiifolius Mill.; Convolvulus bifidus Vahl; Convolvulus blandus Roxb.; Convolvulus caliginosus J.Koenig ex Choisy; Convolvulus caracassanus Willd. ex Roem. & Schult.; Convolvulus cymosus Desr.; Convolvulus densiflorus Hook. & Arn.; Convolvulus flavus Salisb.; Convolvulus lotnoha Buch.-Ham. ex Wall.; Convolvulus luteus M. Martens & Galeotti; Convolvulus multiflorus Mill.; Convolvulus pentagonus Roxb.; Convolvulus rothii (Schult.) Spreng.; Convolvulus sagittifer Kunth; Convolvulus triflorus Vahl; Convolvulus umbellatus Sessé & Moc.; Convolvulus umbellatus L.; Ipomoea bifida Roem. & Schult.; Ipomoea blanda (Roxb.) Sweet; Ipomoea caliginosa Choisy; Ipomoea cymosa (Desr.) Roem. & Schult.; Ipomoea fulvicoma Hance; Ipomoea heynei Roem. & Schult.; Ipomoea longipes Garcke; Ipomoea micans Garcke; Ipomoea mollicoma Miq.; Ipomoea multiflora (Mill.) Roem. & Schult.; Ipomoea pentagona Sweet; Ipomoea polyanthes Roem. & Schult.; Ipomoea portobellensis Beurl.; Ipomoea primuliflora G.Don; Ipomoea rothii Roem. & Schult.; Ipomoea sagittifer (Kunth) G.Don; Ipomoea tonkinensis Gagnep.; Ipomoea triantha Roem. & Schult.; Ipomoea umbellata (L.) G.Mey.; Latrienda multiflora (Mill.) Raf.; Merremia rondoniana Hoehne; Merremia umbellata (L.) Hallier f.

= Camonea umbellata =

Species of plant

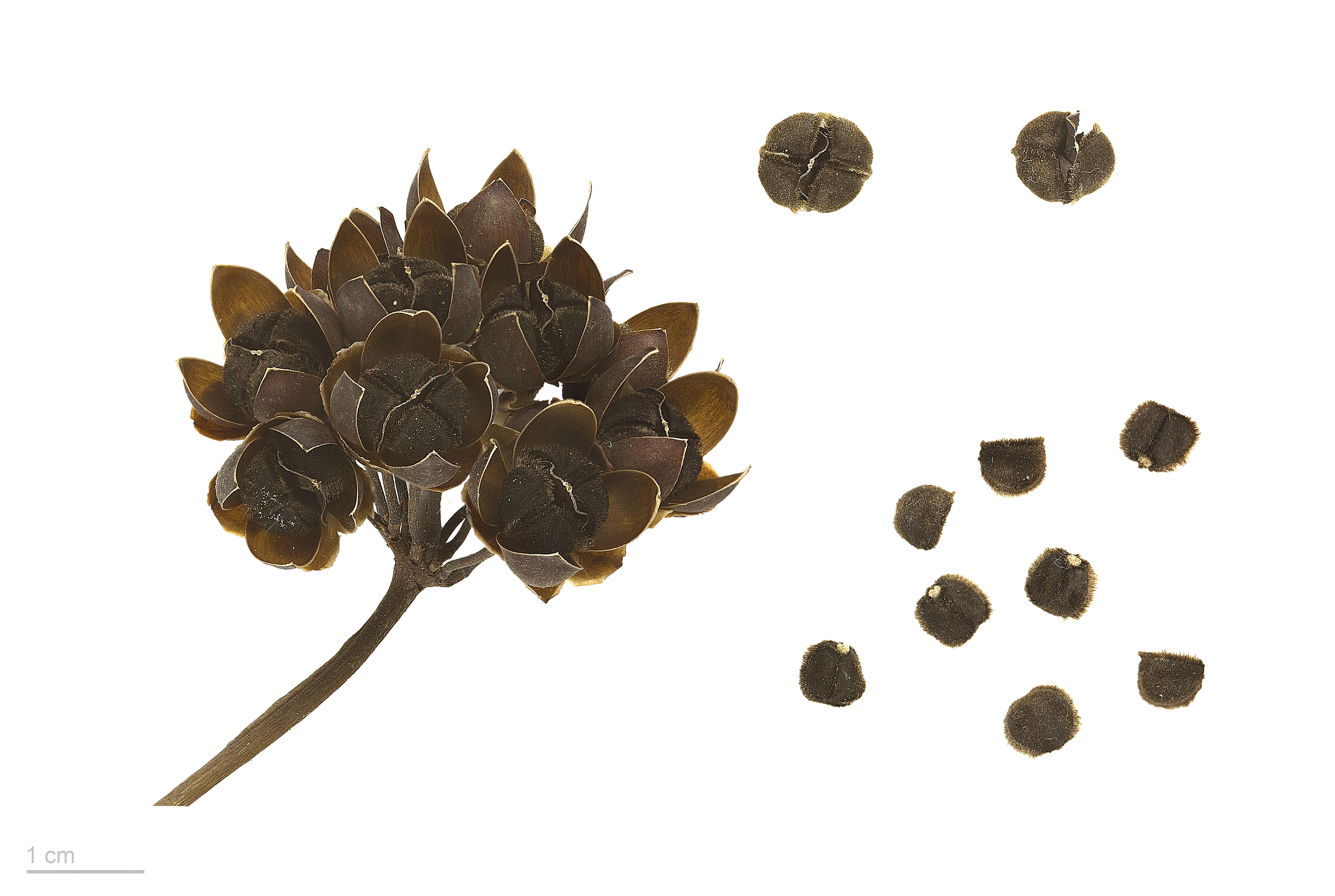
Merremia umbellata ssp umbellata - MHNT

Camonea umbellata, commonly known as hogvine, yellow merremia, and yellow wood rose, is a thin vine growing to a maximum thickness of 2 cm (0.79 in). It has many uses in Indian traditional medicines. The flowers attract bees, butterflies and birds.
