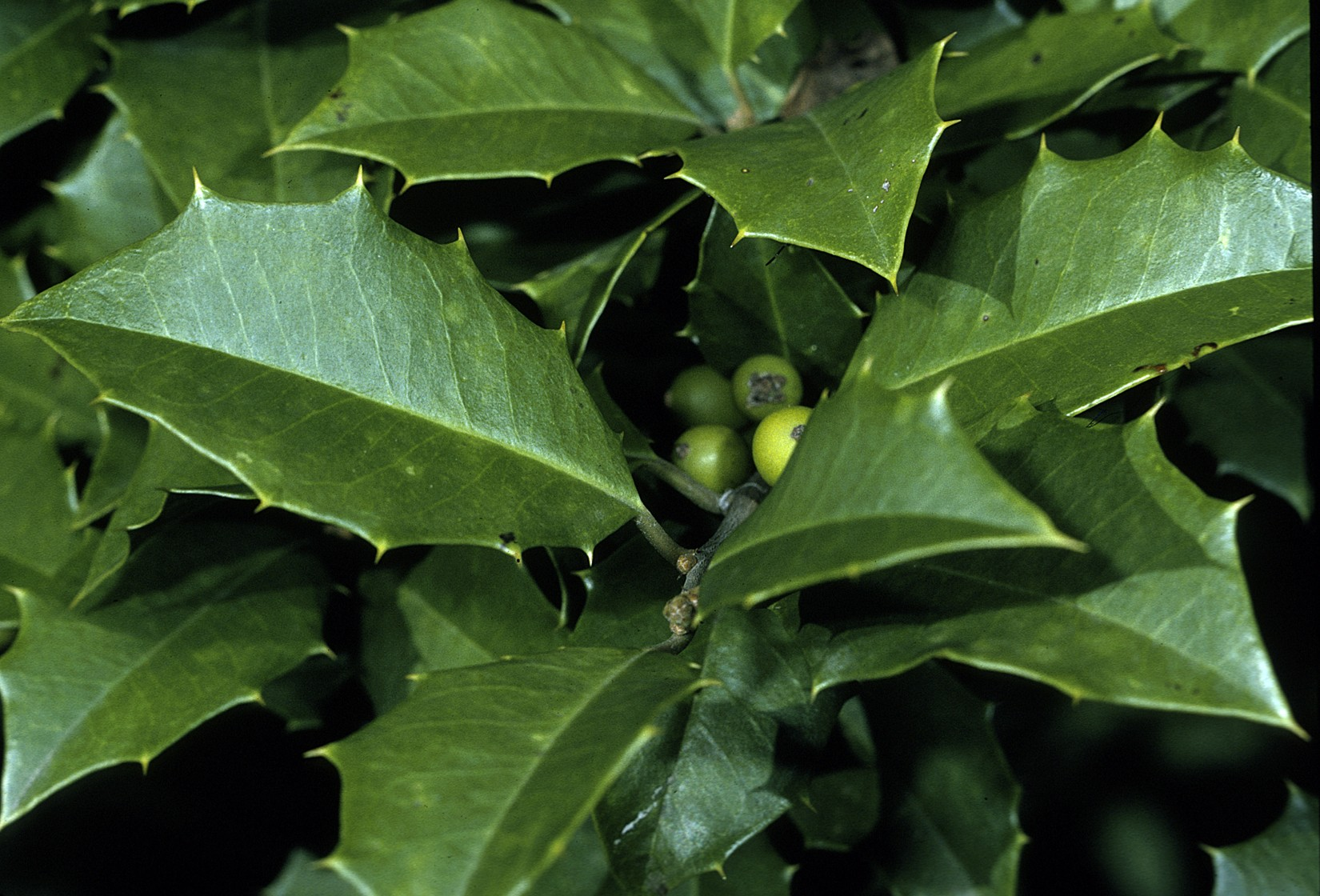
- Foliage and immature fruit

Conservation status
- Least Concern (IUCN 3.1)

- Secure (NatureServe)

Scientific classification
- Kingdom: Plantae
- Clade: Tracheophytes
- Clade: Angiosperms
- Clade: Eudicots
- Clade: Asterids
- Order: Aquifoliales
- Family: Aquifoliaceae
- Genus: Ilex
- Species: I. opaca

Binomial name
- Ilex opaca Aiton
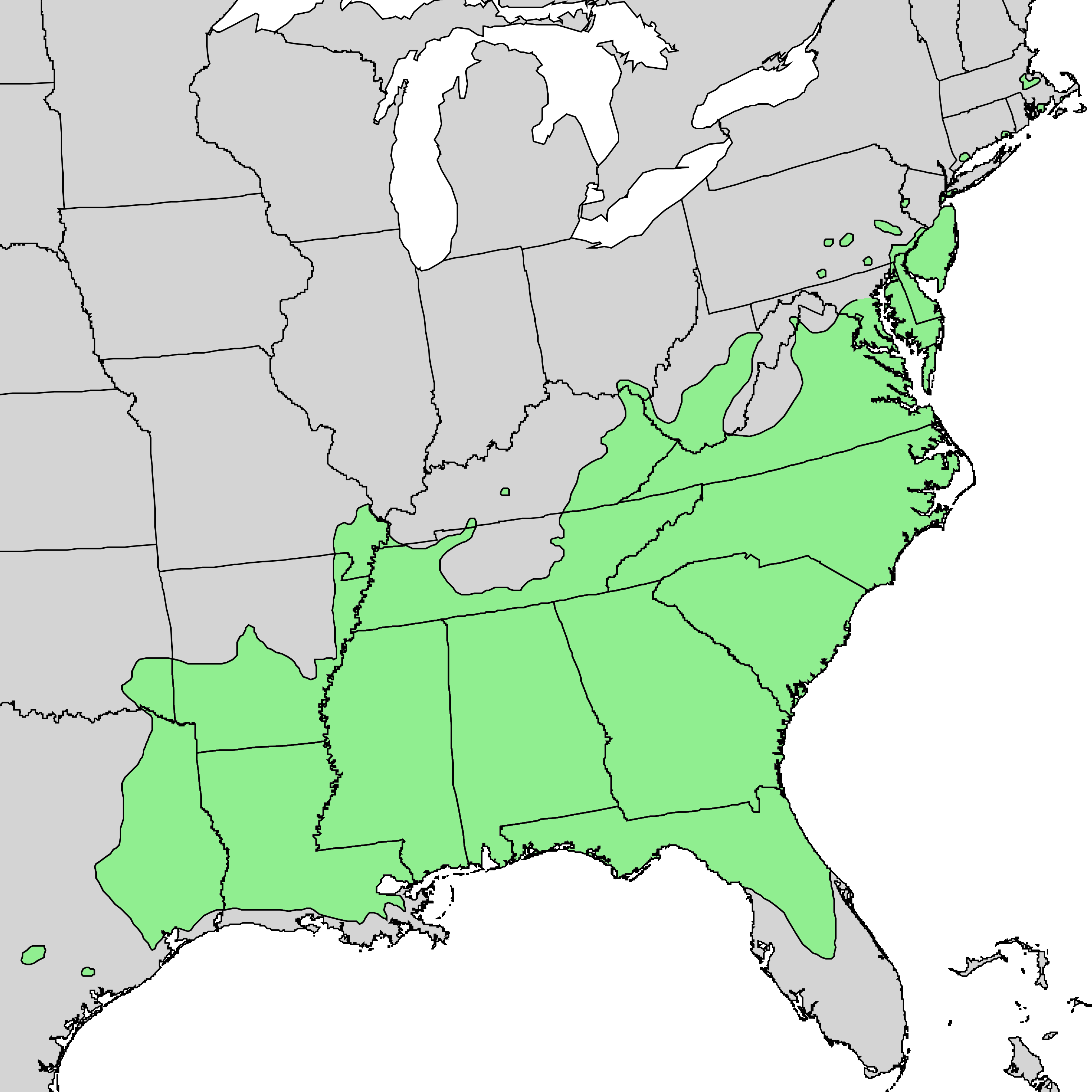
- Natural range of Ilex opaca

Synonyms
- Ageria opaca Raf.; Ilex arenicola Ashe, syn of subsp. arenicola; Ilex laxiflora Lam., syn of subsp. laxiflora

= Ilex opaca =

Species of holly

Ilex opaca, the American holly, is a species of holly, native to the eastern and south-central United States, from coastal Massachusetts south to central Florida, and west to southeastern Missouri and eastern Texas.

== Description ==
Ilex opaca is a medium-sized broadleaved evergreen tree growing on average to 10–20 m (33–66 ft) wide, and up to 30 m (98 ft) tall. Typically, its trunk diameter reaches 50 cm (20 in), sometimes up to 120 cm (47 in). The bark is light gray, roughened by small warty lumps. The branchlets are stout, green at first and covered with rusty down, later smooth and brown. The winter buds are brown, short, obtuse or acute. The branches are short and slender. The roots are thick and fleshy.

The leaves are alternate, 5–7.5 cm (2.0–3.0 in) long and 2–4 cm (0.79–1.57 in) wide, stiff, yellow green and dull matte to sub-shiny above (distinctly less glossy than the otherwise fairly similar European holly, Ilex aquifolium), often pale yellow beneath; the edges are curved into several sharp, spike-like points, and a wedge-shaped base and acute apex; the midrib is prominent and depressed, the primary veins conspicuous; the petiole is short, stout, grooved, thickened at base, with a pair of minute stipules. The leaves remain on the branches for two to three years, finally falling in the spring when pushed off by growing buds.

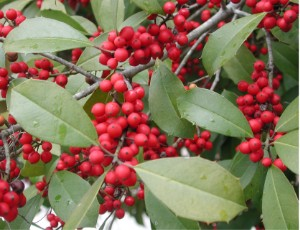
Ripe fruit

The flowers are greenish white, small, borne in late spring in short pedunculate cymes from the axils of young leaves or scattered along the base of young branches. The calyx is small, four-lobed, imbricate in the bud, acute, margins ciliate, persistent. The corolla is white, with four petal-like lobes united at the base, obtuse, spreading, hypogynous, imbricate in bud. The flower stem is hairy with a minute bract at base. Like all hollies, it is dioecious, with separate male and female plants; only female plants produce the characteristic red berries. This fruit (drupes) appear late in the season, and whether due to the need to ripen or being a food of last resort, often last until midwinter. They are poisonous to dogs, cats, and humans, often causing diarrhea, vomiting, dehydration, and drowsiness if ingested. Cedar waxwings (Bombycilla cedrorum) will strip the trees of fruit if they are not already bare during their northward migration. One male can pollenize several females. Male flowers have four stamens, inserted on the base of the corolla, alternate with its lobes; filaments awl-shaped, exserted in the sterile, much shorter in the sterile flower; anthers attached at the back, oblong, introrse, two-celled, cells opening longitudinally. The pistil on female flowers has a superior ovary, four-celled, rudimentary in staminate flowers; style wanting, stigma sessile, four-lobed; ovules one or two in each cell.

The fruit is a small red drupe 6–12 mm diameter containing four seeds; it is often persistent into winter.

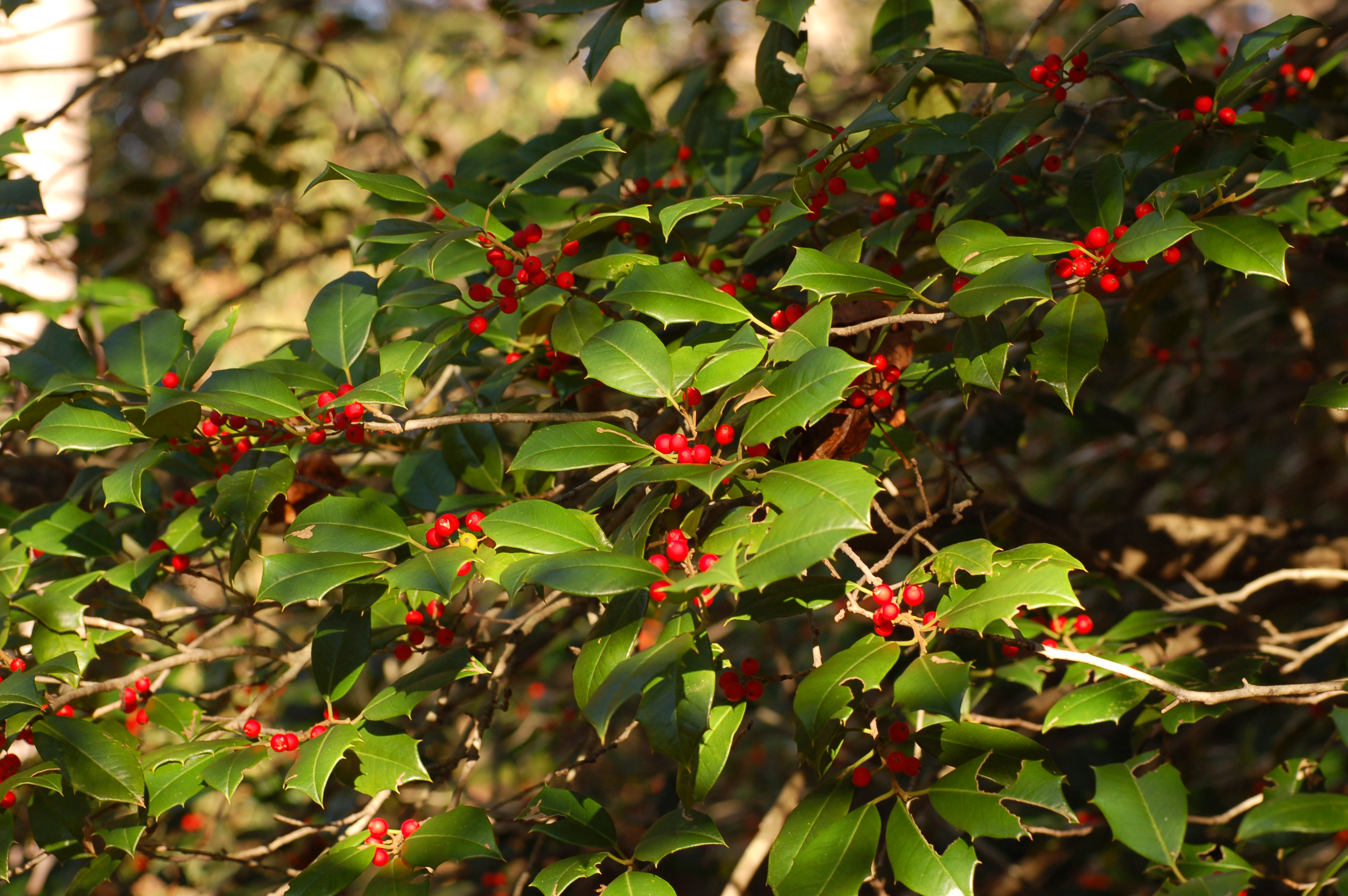
Branch full of ripe fruit

A ratio of three female plants to one male plant is required for ideal fruit production.

The current world record American Holly tree is located in Rose Bud, White County, Arkansas. According to the National Forests Champion Trees Official Register, it boasts a trunk circumference of 182 inches, a height of 64 feet, and a crown spread of 63 feet.

== Taxonomy ==
It has four recognized subspecies/variations:

- Ilex opaca subsp. arenicola (Ashe) A.E. Murray
- Ilex opaca var. laxiflora (Lam.) Nutt.
- Ilex opaca subsp. opaca
- Ilex opaca var. opaca

== Ecology ==
Due to its shade tolerance, Ilex opaca typically grows as an understory tree in moist forests of the east-central, southeastern, and south-central United States. It is found in sparse numbers in the northern part of its range from Cape Cod, Massachusetts, south to northern New Jersey (including southern Connecticut and southeastern New York, on Long Island). It is abundant further south on the Gulf and Atlantic lowlands. It will grow in both dry and swampy soil, but grows slowly. Ilex opaca var. arenicola, or scrub holly, is found as a shrub component in xeric scrub habitats of the Florida peninsula. The ideal yearly precipitation average for the species ranges from 102 cm to 165 cm.

The flowers are pollinated by insects, including bees, wasps, ants, and night-flying moths. It is a larval host plant for Callophrys henrici. The tree also forms a thick canopy which offers protection for birds from predators and storms. Songbirds including thrushes, mockingbirds, catbirds, bluebirds and thrashers, as well as some gamebirds and mammals frequently feed on the berries.

== Cultivation and uses ==
The wood is very pale, tough, close-grained, takes a good polish, and is used for whip-handles, engraving blocks and also cabinet work. It can also be dyed and used as a substitute for ebony. It has a density of 0.58 to 0.64. The sap is watery, and contains a bitter substance used as an herbal tonic.

Leaves from the American holly can be used to make a tea-like beverage. American holly tea does not contain caffeine.

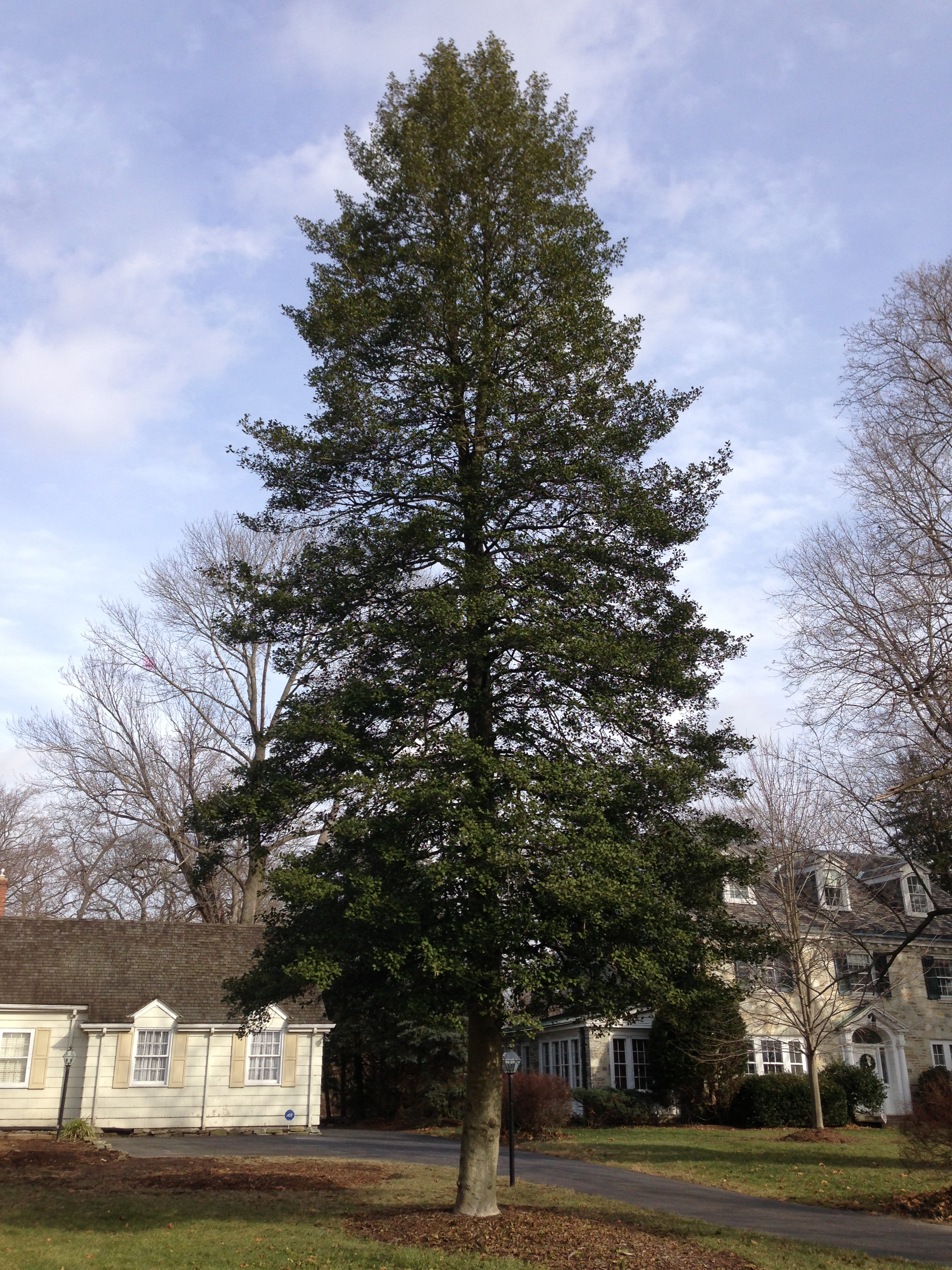
Mature plants often display a pyramidal shape

=== Ornamental plant ===
Ilex opaca is often cultivated by plant nurseries for use as a broadleaf evergreen ornamental plant, planted as a shrub or slower growing ornamental tree. Over 1,000 cultivars have been selected, including plants selected for cold tolerance ('Cobalt', a male cultivar, is able to tolerate temperatures as low as −32 °C), growth form (e.g. dwarf forms such as 'Cardinal Hedge', a female plant growing to 1.2 m tall), and color and abundance of fruit (notable female cultivars including the large-berried 'Yule', and the yellow-berried 'Canary' and 'Morgan Gold'). With Ilex cassine it is a parent of the hybrid Ilex × attenuata, which has ornamental cultivars.

=== The holly in winter ===
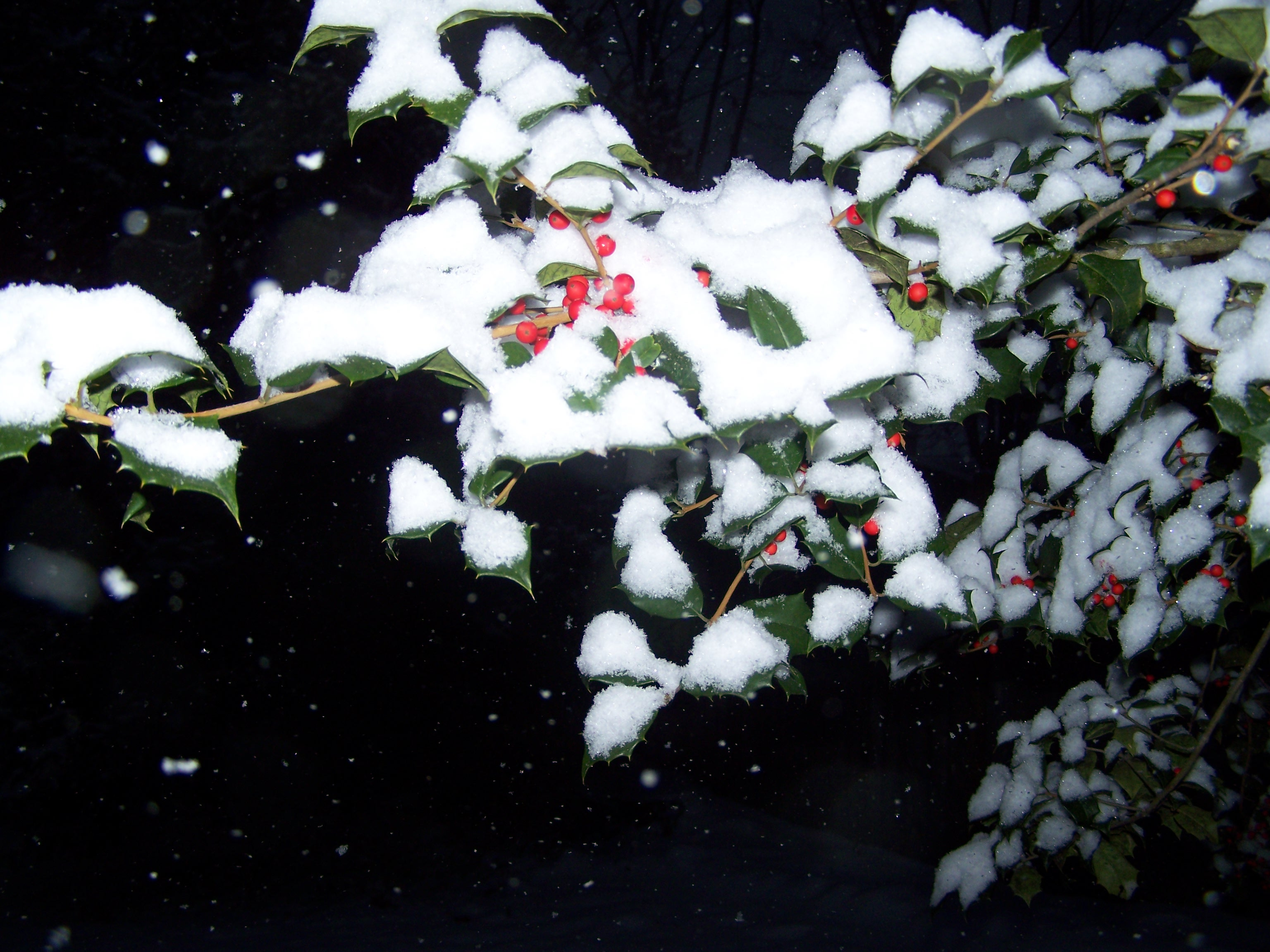
Not only is the holly associated with winter decoration, it serves as a source of food and shelter during inclement weather

Holly is a popular winter Christmas and holiday season decoration. To Christians, the thorny foliage is attributed to the crown of thorns Christ wore, the berries represent his drops of blood, and the evergreen represents life after death. In English poetry and English stories the holly is inseparably connected with the merry-making and greetings which gather around the Christmas time. The custom is followed in North America, and holly and mistletoe are widely used for decoration of homes and churches.

The European holly is smaller than the American holly, but is closely related and closely resembles it. The leaves of both species are similar in outline and toothed and bristled very much the same way, but the leaves are brighter in the American holly and larger. The American holly, called the evergreen or Christmas holly (Ilex opaca Aiton) was named the state tree of Delaware on 1 May 1939.
