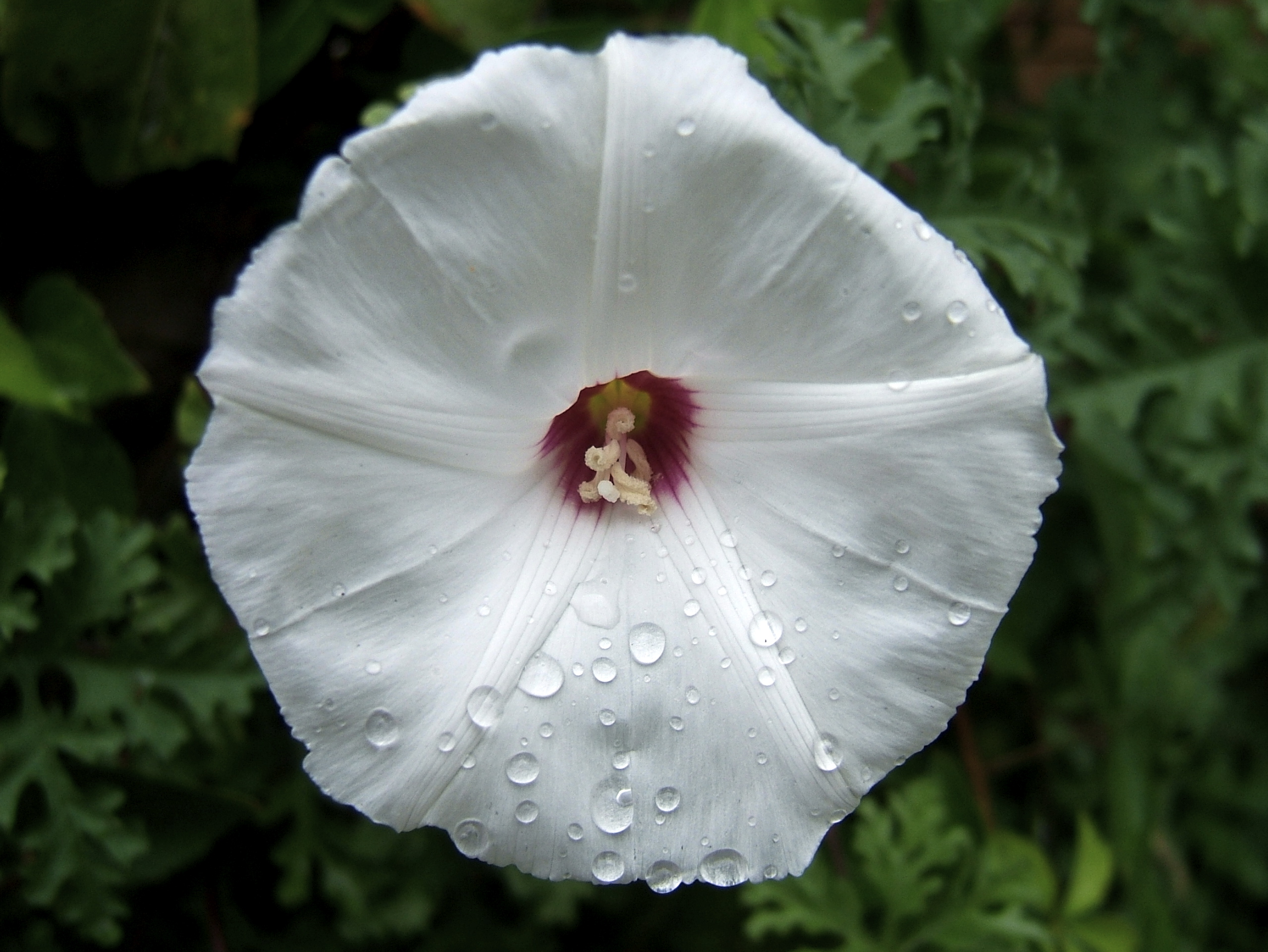

Conservation status
- Secure (NatureServe)

Scientific classification
- Kingdom: Plantae
- Clade: Tracheophytes
- Clade: Angiosperms
- Clade: Eudicots
- Clade: Asterids
- Order: Solanales
- Family: Convolvulaceae
- Genus: Distimake
- Species: D. dissectus

Binomial name
- Distimake dissectus (Jacq.) A.R.Simões & Staples

Synonyms
- Convolvulus dissectus Jacq.; Ipomoea dissecta (Jacq.) Pursh; Merremia dissecta (Jacq.) Hallier f.; Operculina dissecta (Jacq.) House

= Distimake dissectus =

Species of flowering plant

Distimake dissectus is a species of plant in the family Convolvulaceae and is native to North, Central, and South America.
