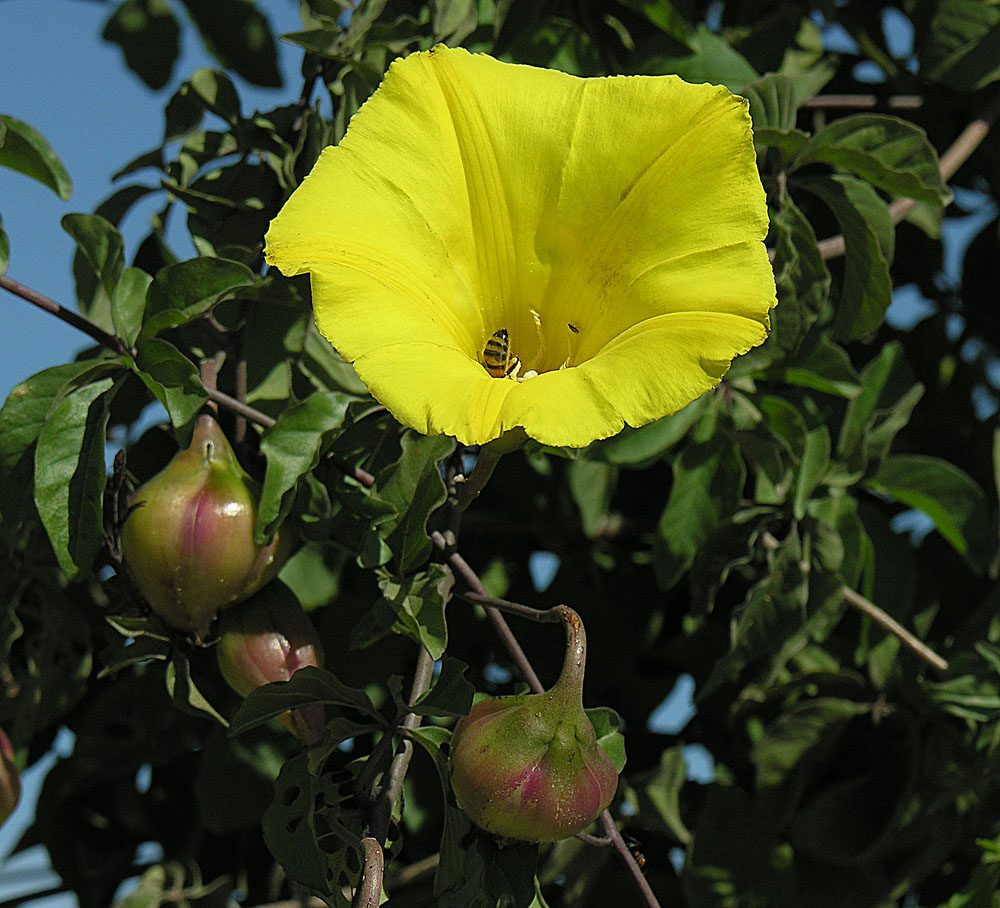

Scientific classification
- Kingdom: Plantae
- Clade: Tracheophytes
- Clade: Angiosperms
- Clade: Eudicots
- Clade: Asterids
- Order: Solanales
- Family: Convolvulaceae
- Genus: Distimake
- Species: D. aureus

Binomial name
- Distimake aureus (Kellogg) A.R.Simões & Staples

Synonyms
- Aniseia aurea Kellogg 1873; Ipomoea aurea (Kellogg) Kellogg ex Curran; Merremia aurea (Kellogg) O'Donell; Operculina aurea (Kellogg) House

= Distimake aureus =

Species of flowering plant

Distimake aureus is a species of vining plant in the bindweed family (Convolvulaceae) commonly known as the yellow morning-glory, yellow woodrose or yuca vine. A woody vine, this species is characterized by its large trumpet-shaped yellow flowers that bloom year-round, though most often after rain. Each of the showy flowers are only open for a single day. It is endemic to Baja California Sur, Mexico, where it can be found twining and climbing over trees, shrubs, and rocks.

== Description ==
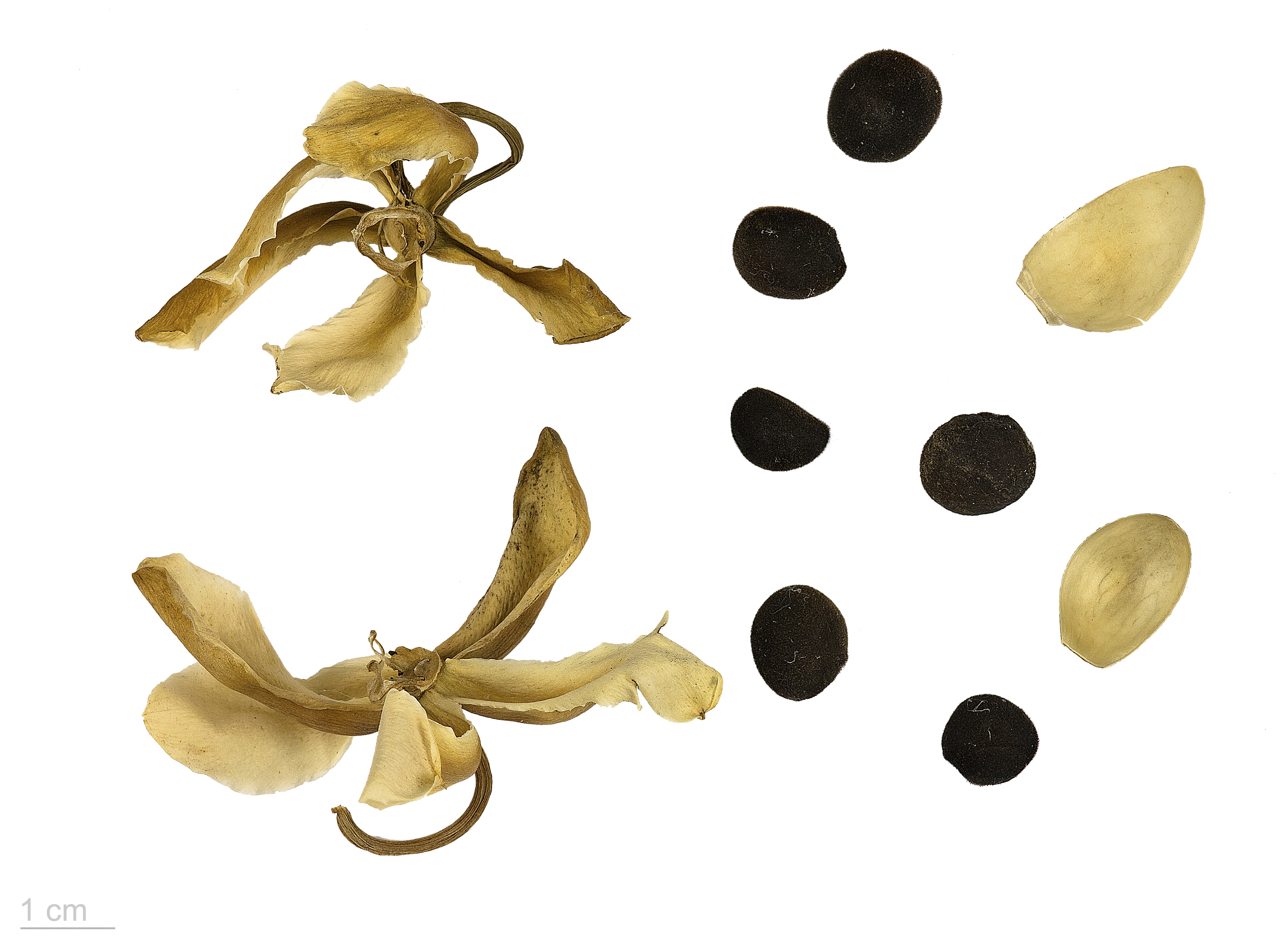
The seeds

This plant is a perennial woody vine. It is deciduous and may drop its leaves in severe heat. The leaves are palmate, with 5 oblong leaflets, the median leaflet the largest. The edges of the leaflets are smooth and not serrated, unlike a local congener D. quinquefolius which has narrower serrated leaflets and white flowers.

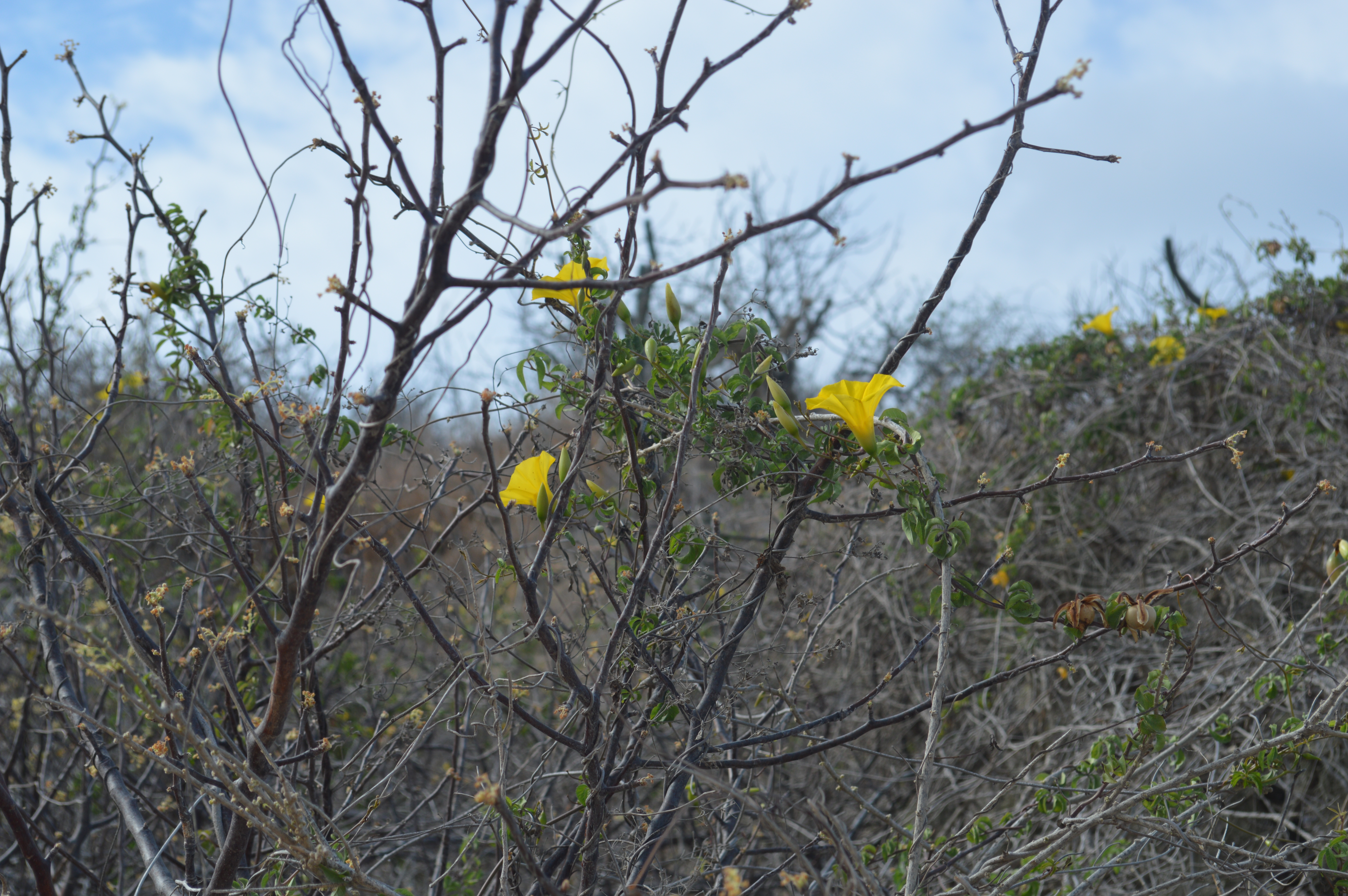
In habitat

The trumpet-shaped flowers on this species are borne solitary, measure 3 to 8 cm (1.2 to 3.1 in) long, and are colored a bright yellow. Each flower only blooms for a single day, opening in the morning and closing by the late afternoon. The fruit is a capsule with two cells, 2 to 2.5 cm (0.79 to 0.98 in) wide.

== Distribution ==
Endemic to the state of Baja California Sur in Mexico, this species is found from the vicinity of Loreto south to the Cape region of the Baja California peninsula. It is also found on several islands in the Gulf of California.

== Uses ==
The fleshy roots of the plant are edible.

This species is utilized in cultivation as an ornamental plant. It requires full sun and low water, and needs well-drained soil. It is hardy to US Sunset Zones of 12 to 24.
