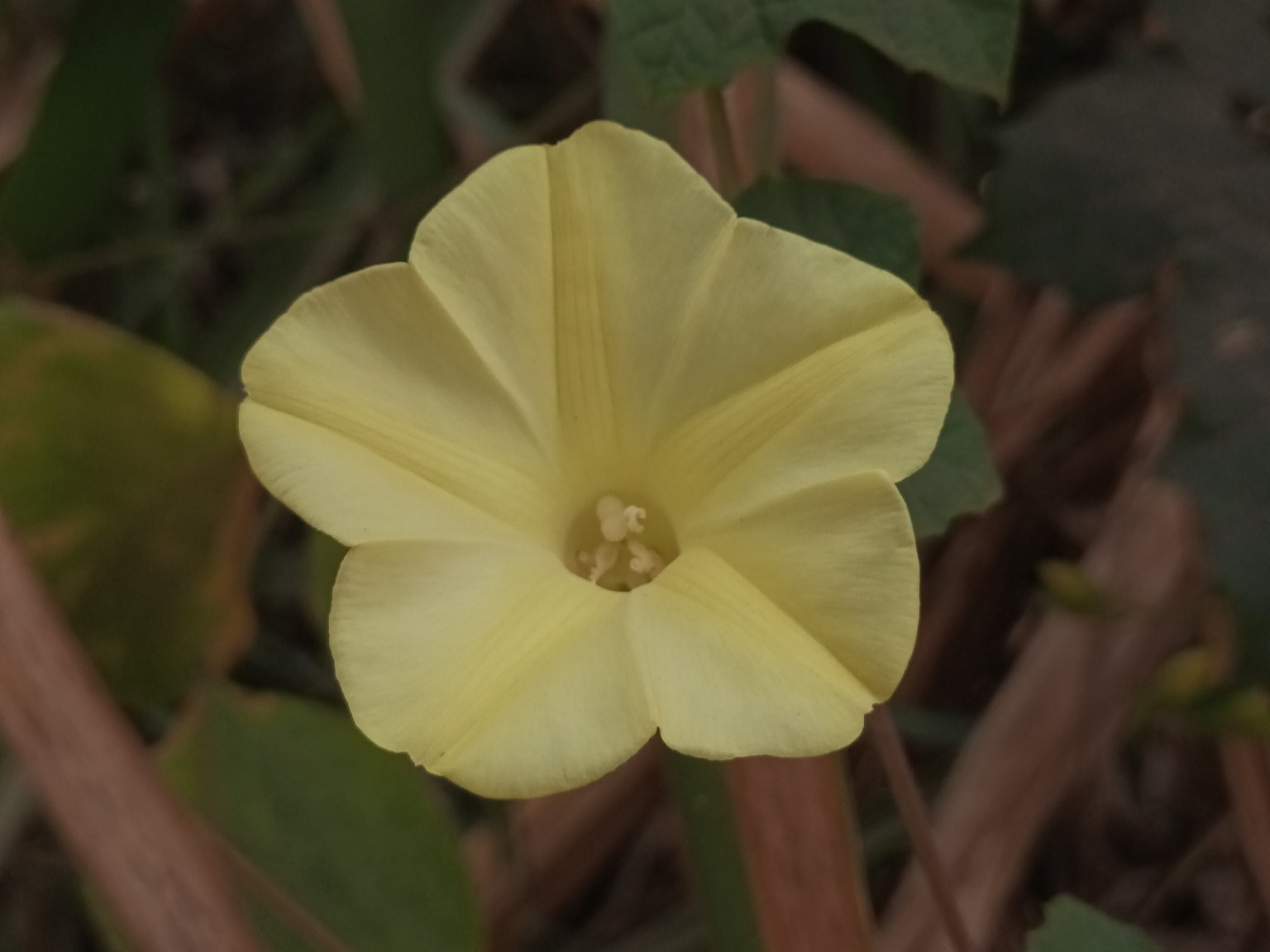

Scientific classification
- Kingdom: Plantae
- Clade: Tracheophytes
- Clade: Angiosperms
- Clade: Eudicots
- Clade: Asterids
- Order: Solanales
- Family: Convolvulaceae
- Genus: Distimake
- Species: D. vitifolius

Binomial name
- Distimake vitifolius (Burm.f.) Pisuttimarn & Petrongari

Synonyms
- Camonea vitifolia (Burm.f.) A.R.Simões & Staples; Convolvulus vitifolius Burm.f.; Ipomoea vitifolia (Burm.f.) Sweet; Merremia vitifolia (Burm.f.) Hallier f.; Convolvulus angularis Burm.f.; Ipomoea angularis (Burm.f.) Choisy; Ipomoea vitifolia Blume; Ipomoea vitifolia var. angularis (Burm.f.) Choisy

= Distimake vitifolius =

Species of flowering plant

Distimake vitifolius is a flowering vine of the family Convolvulaceae, native to tropical & subtropical Asia.

== Description ==
Twiners with deciduous, fulvous hairs. Leaf ovate, cordate, digitately five to seven lobes, 5 cm–12 cm × 4 cm–10 cm (2.0 in–4.7 in × 1.6 in–3.9 in); lobes dentate, ovate, acuminate. Cyme few-flowered; peduncle 3–5 cm (1.2–2.0 in), long Sepals ovate-lanceolate, obtuse and mucronate, to 2 cm (0.79 in) long. Corolla campanulate, yellow, glabrous, 3–5 cm (1.2–2.0 in) long Capsule globose, to 1 cm (0.39 in) across, yellow

== Distribution ==
Distimake vitifolius is distributed across the Indomalayan realm, that is India, Sri Lanka, Nepal, China, Malaysia.

== Gallery ==
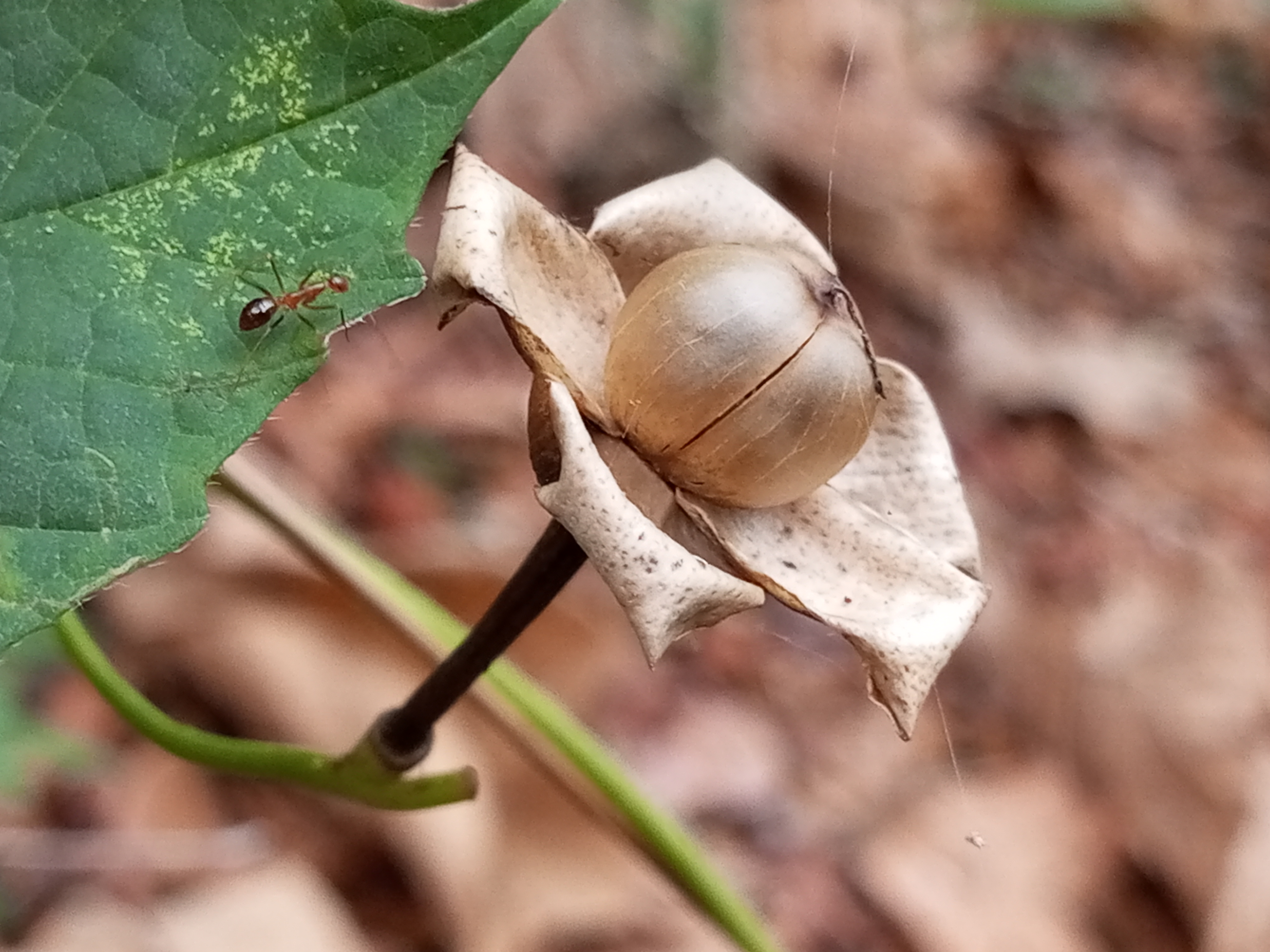
Fruit

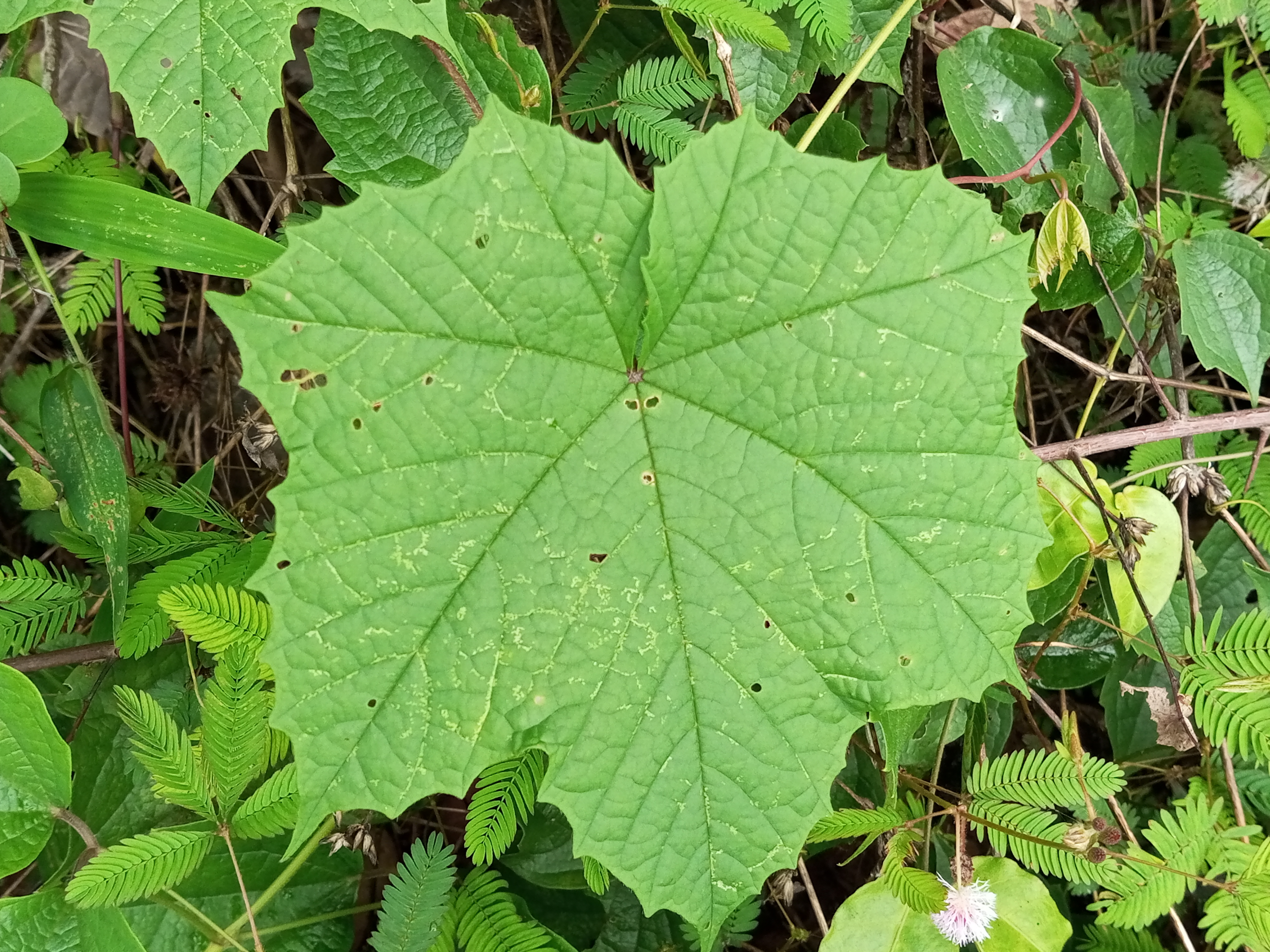
Leaf

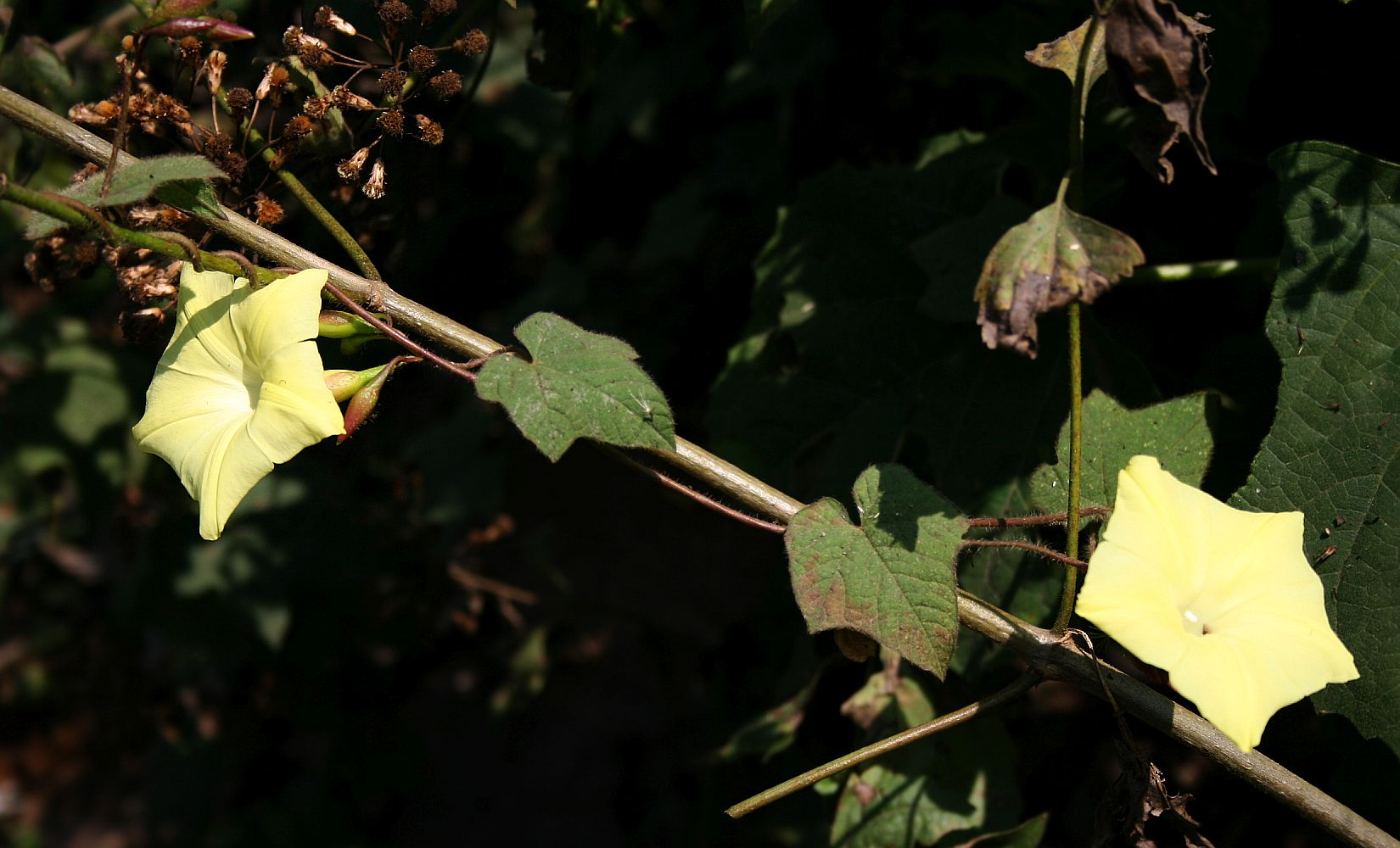
Flowers
