= Aestivation (botany) =

Arrangement of flower parts within a bud

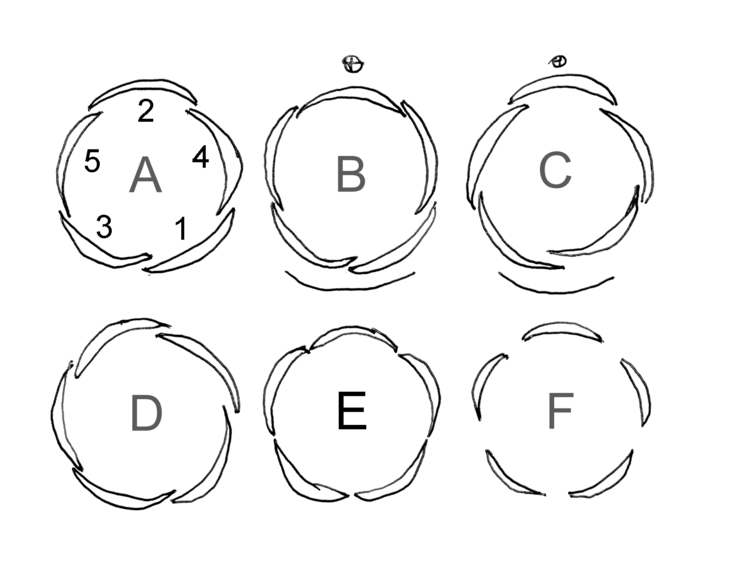
A diagram showing some kinds of petal or sepal aestivation in flower buds. A: quincuncial; B: ascending cochleate; C: descending cochleate; D: contorted; E: valvate; F: open.

Aestivation or estivation is the positional arrangement of the parts of a flower within a flower bud before it has opened. Aestivation is also sometimes referred to as praefoliation or prefoliation, but these terms may also mean vernation: the arrangement of leaves within a vegetative bud.

Aestivation can be an important taxonomic diagnostic; for example Malvaceae flower buds have valvate sepals, with the exception of the genera Fremontodendron and Chiranthodendron, which have sometimes been misplaced as a result.

== Terminology ==
Aestivation patterns in August Eichler's Blüthendiagramme. A; quincuncial, B-C; ascending and descending cochlear, D-E; left- and right-twisted, F: irregular cochlear.

The terms used to describe aestivation are the same as those used to describe leaf vernation.

Classes of aestivation include:

- crumpled
- decussate
- imbricate – overlapping
  - contorted or twisted – every petal or sepal is outside its neighbour on one margin, and inside its neighbour on the other margin.
    - cochleate – spirally twisted; may also refer to arrangements where one petal has its two edges outside those of the adjacent petals, one has its two edges both inside, and the other petals have one edge outside and the other inside.
    - contortiplicate – contorted and also plicate.
  - quincuncial – with five parts, where two petals or sepals are outside all others, two are inside all others, and the fifth is outside on one margin and inside on the other.
- induplicate – folded inwards.
- open – petals or sepals do not overlap or even touch each other .
- reduplicate – folded outwards.
- valvate – margins of adjacent petals or sepals touch each other without overlapping.
- vexillary – a special type of aestivation occurring in plants like pea; in this type of aestivation a large petal called standard encloses two smaller petals.
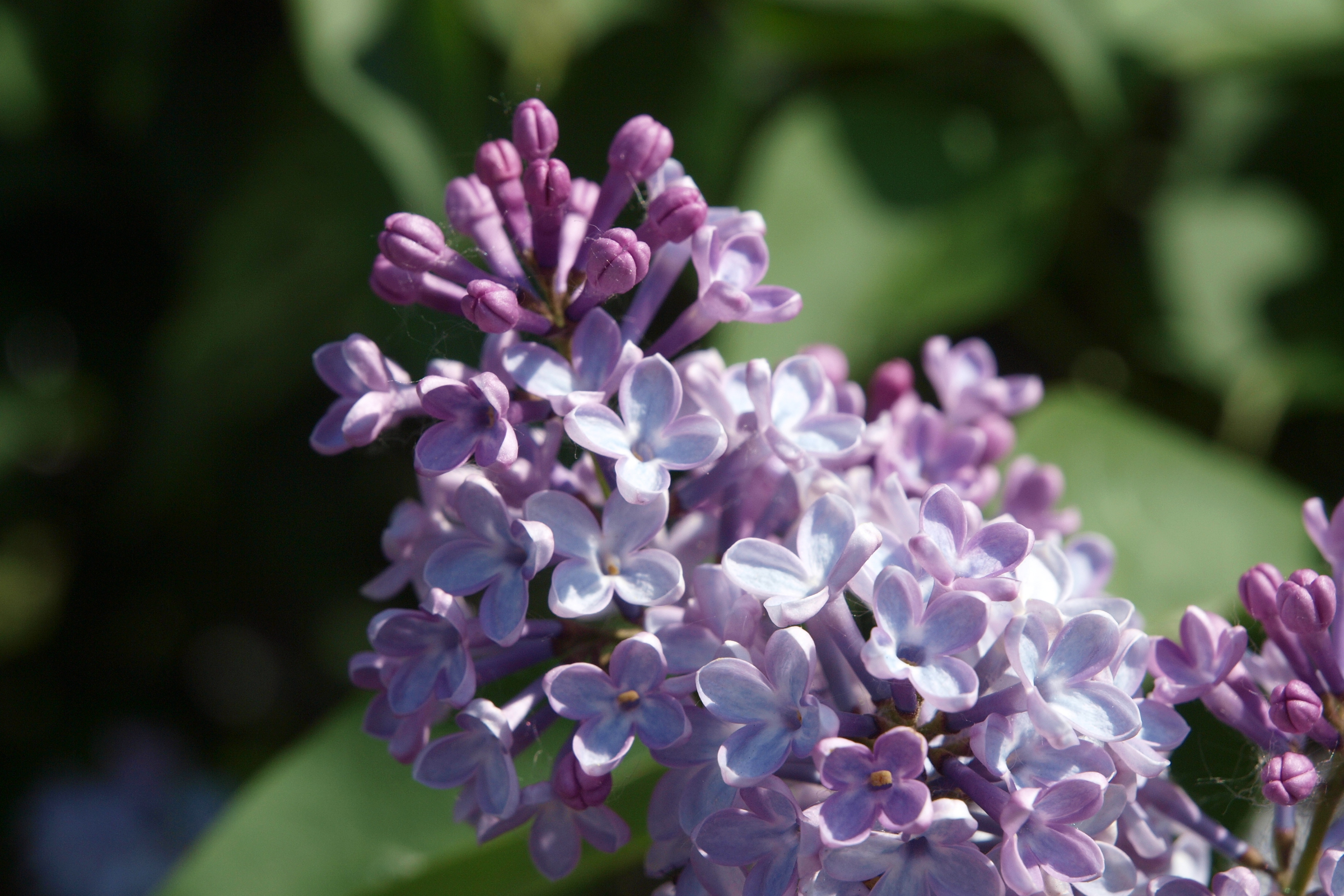
Lilac (Syringa vulgaris), valvate aestivation

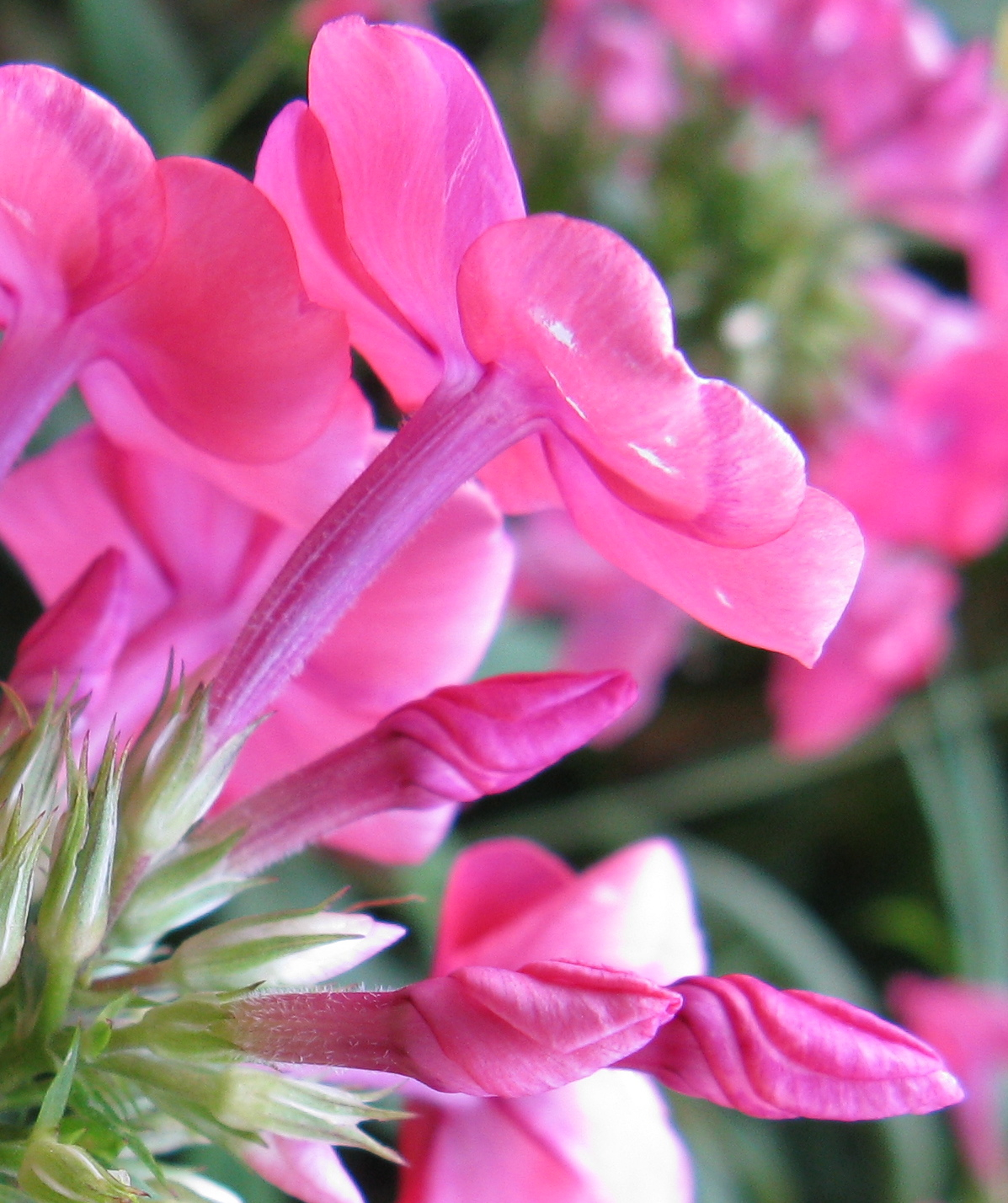
Phlox (Phlox paniculata), contorted aestivation

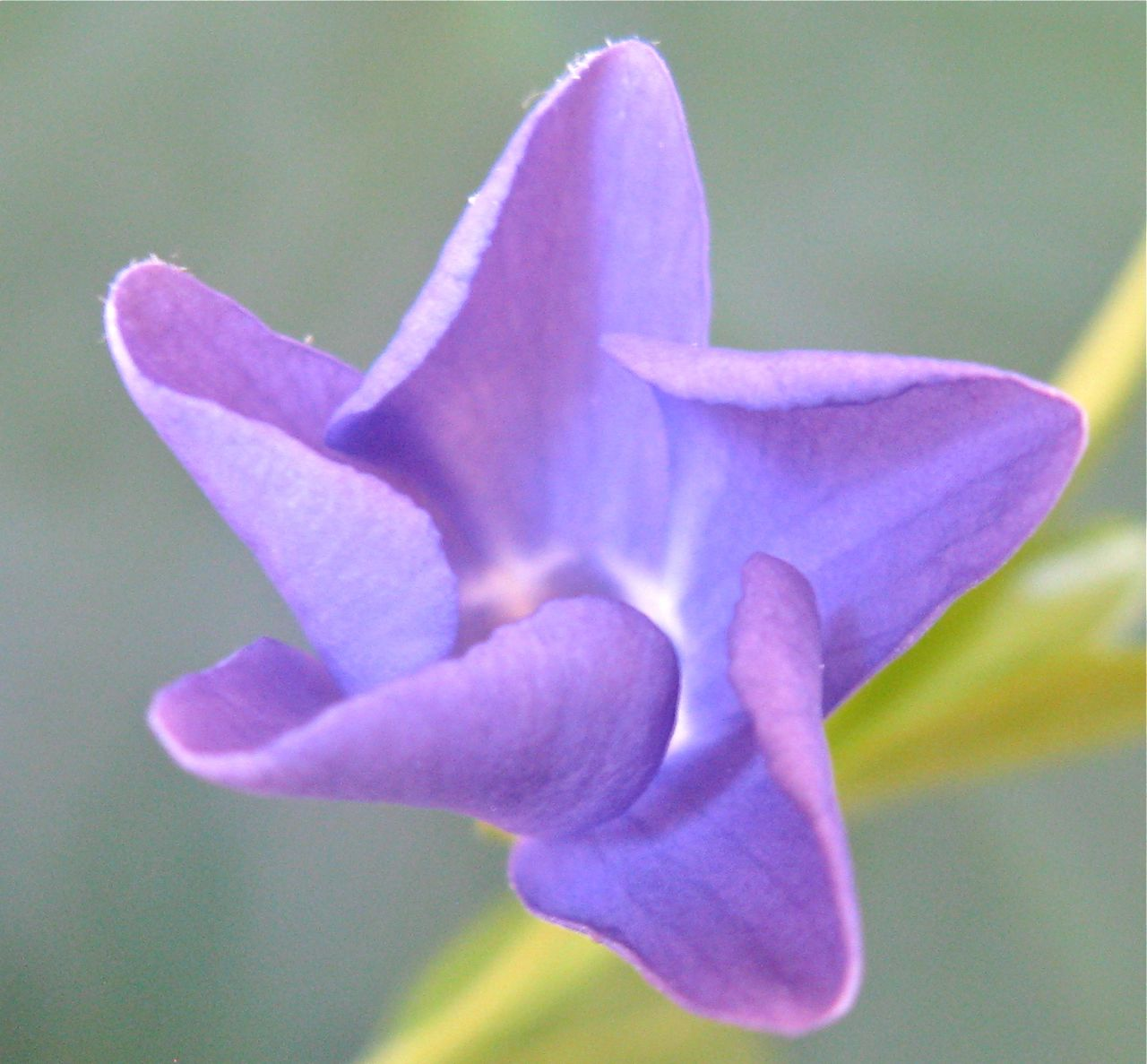
Vinca minor, contorted aestivation

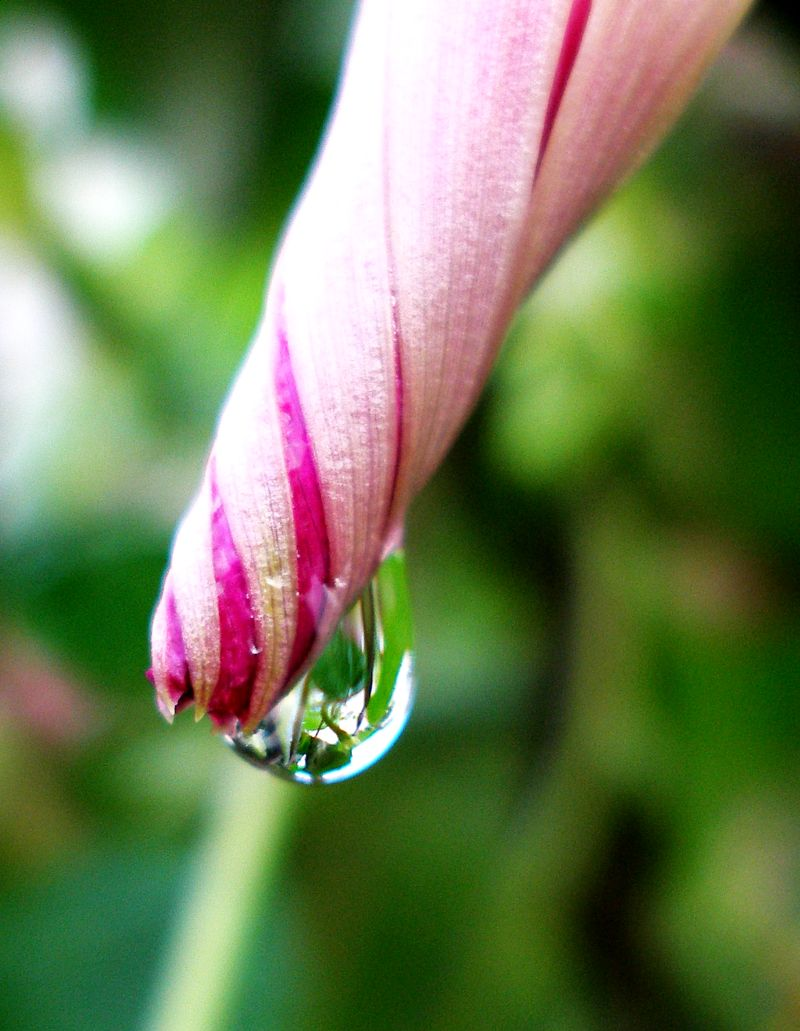
Ipomoea, contortiplicate aestivation

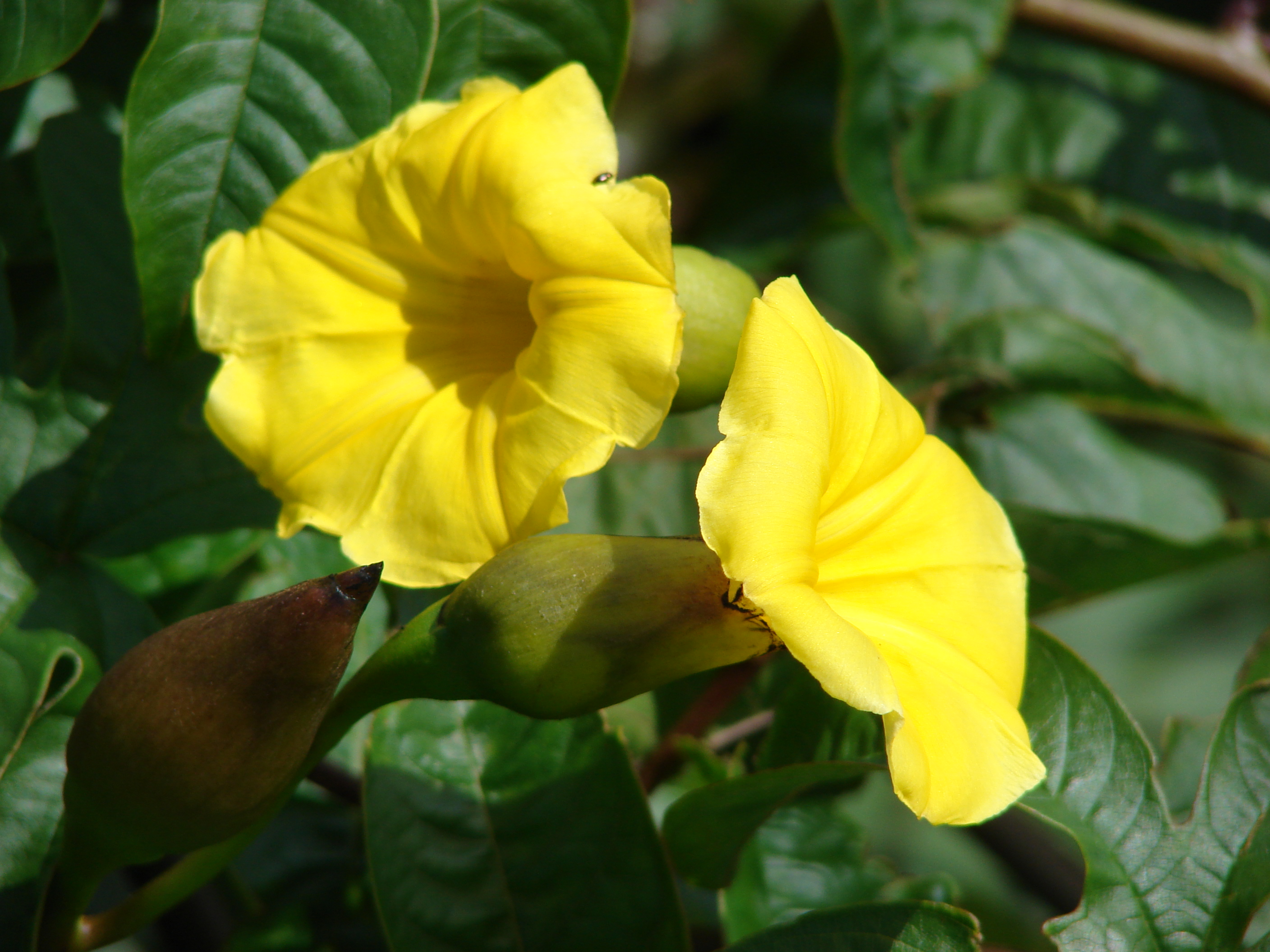
The corolla of Merremia tuberosa was contortiplicate in the bud.
