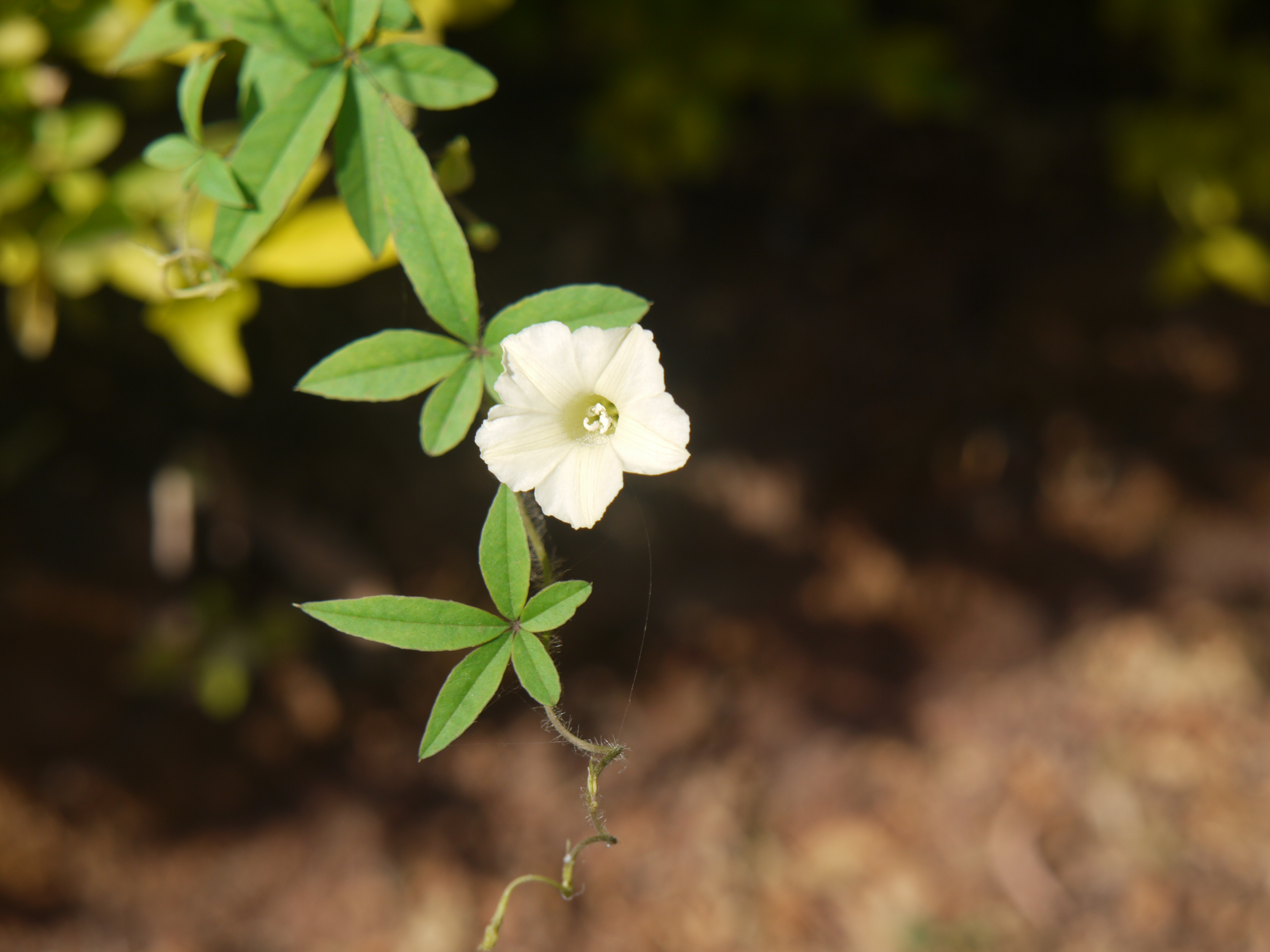
- Distimake quinquefolius

Scientific classification
- Kingdom: Plantae
- Clade: Tracheophytes
- Clade: Angiosperms
- Clade: Eudicots
- Clade: Asterids
- Order: Solanales
- Family: Convolvulaceae
- Tribe: Merremieae
- Genus: Distimake; Raf.

= Distimake =

Genus of plants

Distimake is a genus of flowering plants belonging to the family Convolvulaceae.

Its native range is Tropics and Subtropics.

Species:

- Distimake aegyptius (L.) A.R.Simões & Staples
- Distimake ampelophyllus (Hallier f.) A.R.Simões & Staples
- Distimake aturensis (Kunth) A.R.Simões & Staples
- Distimake aureus (Kellogg) A.R.Simões & Staples
- Distimake austinii (J.A.McDonald) A.R.Simões & Staples
- Distimake bipinnatipartitus (Engl.) A.R.Simões & Staples
- Distimake cielensis (J.A.McDonald) A.R.Simões & Staples
- Distimake cissoides (Lam.) A.R.Simões & Staples
- Distimake contorquens (Choisy) A.R.Simões & Staples
- Distimake davenportii (F.Muell.) A.R.Simões & Staples
- Distimake digitatus (Spreng.) A.R.Simões & Staples
- Distimake dimorphophyllus (Verdc.) A.R.Simões & Staples
- Distimake dissectus (Jacq.) A.R.Simões & Staples
- Distimake ericoides (Meisn.) Petrongari & Sim.-Bianch.
- Distimake flagellaris (Choisy) A.R.Simões & Staples
- Distimake grandiflorus (Ooststr.) A.R.Simões & Staples
- Distimake guerichii (A.Meeuse) A.R.Simões & Staples
- Distimake hasslerianus (Chodat) A.R.Simões & Staples
- Distimake hirsutus (O'Donell) Petrongari & Sim.-Bianch.
- Distimake hoehnei (Petrongari & Sim.-Bianch.) Petrongari & Sim.-Bianch.
- Distimake igneus (Schrad.) A.R.Simões & Staples
- Distimake kentrocaulos (C.B.Clarke) A.R.Simões & Staples
- Distimake kimberleyensis (R.W.Johnson) A.R.Simões & Staples
- Distimake lobulibracteatus (E.Carranza & Murguía) A.R.Simões & Petrongari
- Distimake macdonaldii (S.Valencia & Mart. Gord.) A.R.Simões & Staples
- Distimake macrocalyx (Ruiz & Pav.) A.R.Simões & Staples
- Distimake maragniensis (Choisy) Petrongari & Sim.-Bianch.
- Distimake multisectus (Hallier f.) A.R.Simões & Staples
- Distimake nervosus (Pittier) A.R.Simões & Staples
- Distimake palmeri (S.Watson) A.R.Simões & Staples
- Distimake quercifolius (Hallier f.) A.R.Simões & Staples
- Distimake quinatus (R.Br.) A.R.Simões & Staples
- Distimake quinquefolius (L.) A.R.Simões & Staples
- Distimake repens (D.F.Austin & Staples) Petrongari & Sim.-Bianch.
- Distimake rhyncorhiza (Dalzell) A.R.Simões & Staples
- Distimake sagastegui-alvae (E.Rodr., J.Briceño, Billman & A.Bosw.) A.R.Simões & Petrongari
- Distimake semisagittus (Griseb. ex Peter) A.R.Simões & Staples
- Distimake somalensis (Hallier f.) A.R.Simões & Staples
- Distimake stellatus (Rendle) A.R.Simões & Staples
- Distimake subpalmatus (Verdc.) A.R.Simões & Staples
- Distimake ternifoliolus (Pittier) A.R.Simões & Staples
- Distimake tomentosus (Choisy) Petrongari & Sim.-Bianch.
- Distimake tuberosus (L.) A.R.Simões & Staples
- Distimake weberbaueri (Ooststr.) A.R.Simões & Petrongari
