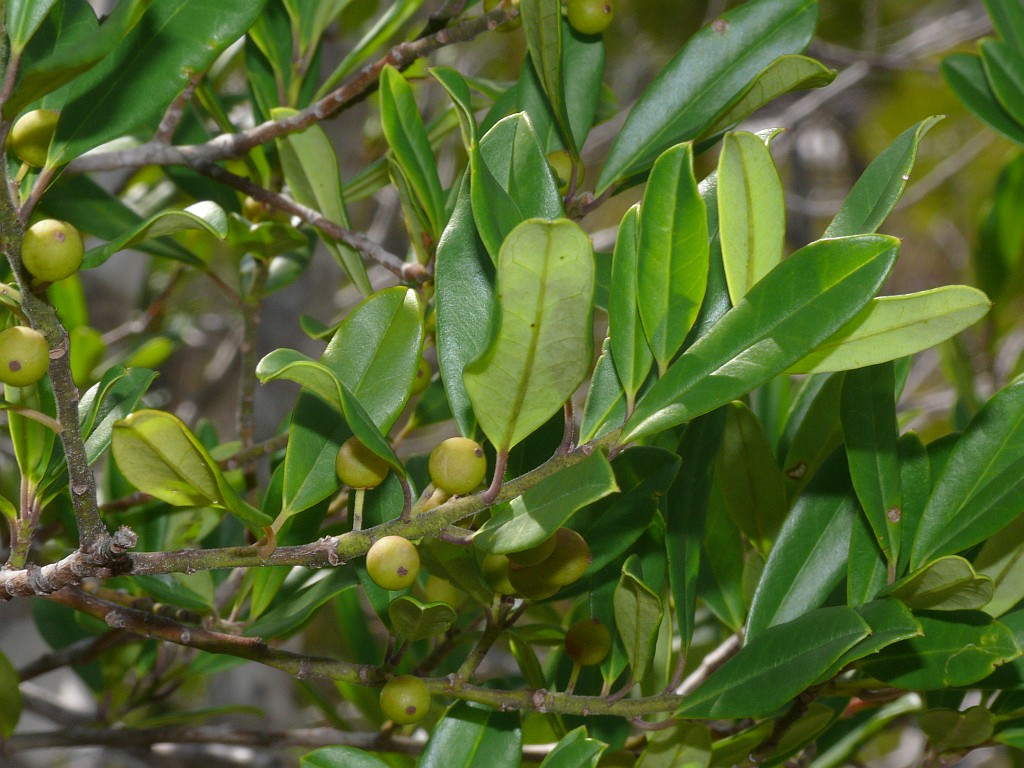

Conservation status
- Least Concern (IUCN 3.1)

Scientific classification
- Kingdom: Plantae
- Clade: Tracheophytes
- Clade: Angiosperms
- Clade: Eudicots
- Clade: Asterids
- Order: Aquifoliales
- Family: Aquifoliaceae
- Genus: Ilex
- Species: I. cassine

Binomial name
- Ilex cassine L.
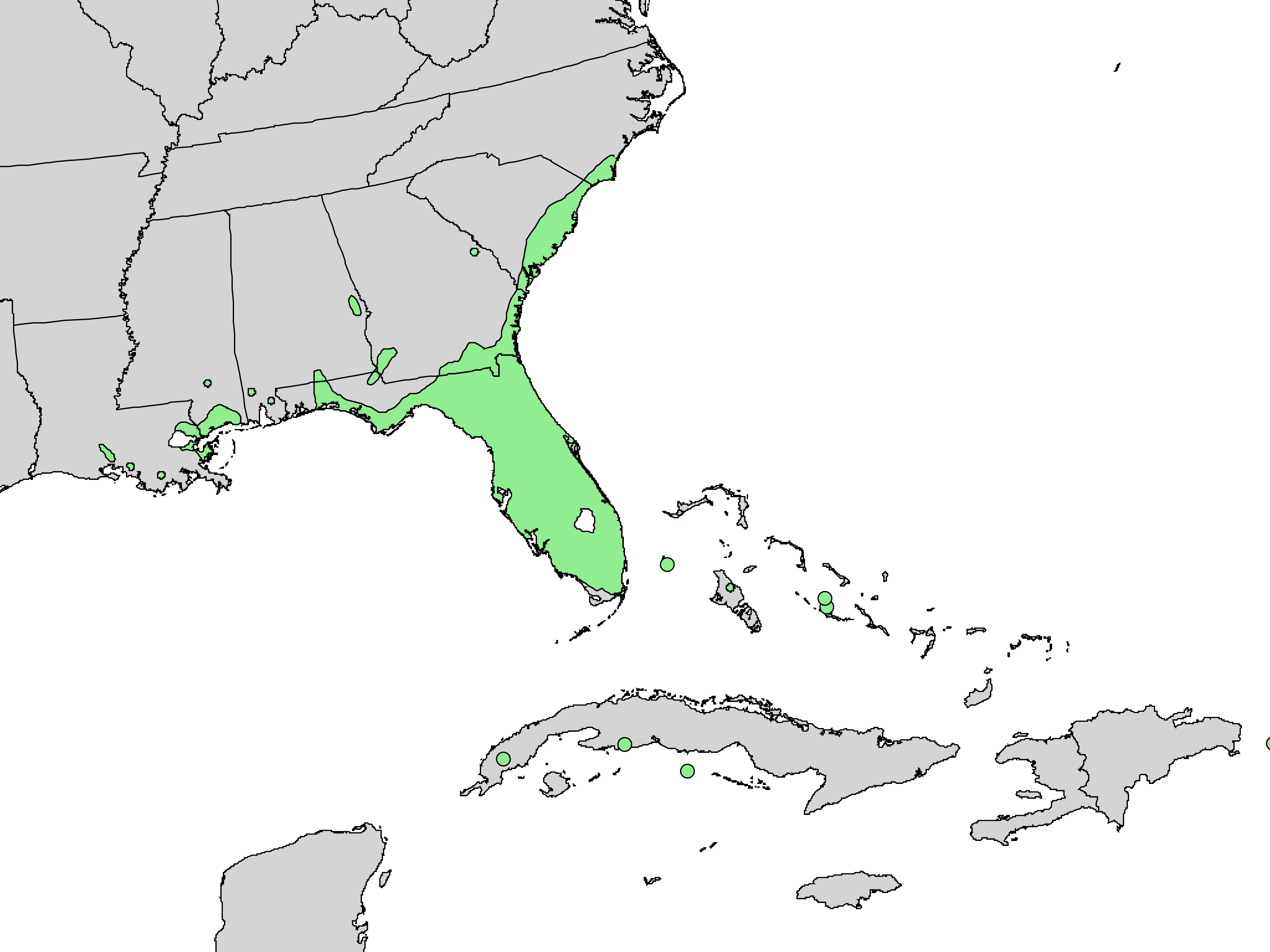
- Natural range in United States

= Ilex cassine =

Species of holly

Ilex cassine is a holly native to the southeastern coast of North America that grows from Virginia south down the East Coast to Florida, then west along the Gulf Coast to the Colorado River in Texas, with subspecies growing southward on the coast of the Gulf of Mexico as far as Veracruz, Mexico, and in Cuba, Puerto Rico, and the Bahamas. It is commonly known as dahoon holly or cassena, the latter derived from the Timucua name for I. vomitoria.

It is a large shrub or small tree growing to 12 meters (39 ft). The leaves are evergreen, 6–15 cm long and 2–4 cm broad, glossy dark green, entire or with a few small spines near the apex of the leaf. The flowers are white, with a four-lobed corolla. The fruit is a red drupe, 5–6 mm in diameter, containing four seeds.

As with other hollies, it is dioecious with separate male and female plants. Only the females have berries, and a male pollenizer must be within range for bees to pollinate them.

== Varieties ==
There are three varieties:

- Ilex cassine var. cassine (United States, Caribbean)
- Ilex cassine var. angustifolia Aiton. (United States)
- Ilex cassine var. mexicana (Turcz.) Loes. (Mexico)

Ilex × attenuata is a naturally occurring hybrid of Ilex cassine and Ilex opaca.

== Natural range and cultivation ==
Ilex cassine is indigenous to the southeastern coast of North America and the Caribbean, growing along the margins of waterways and swamps from Virginia southward down the Atlantic coastline to Florida and west along the Gulf coast to the Colorado River in Texas, with subspecies growing southward as far as Veracruz on the Gulf Coast, and in the Caribbean on the coasts of Cuba, the Bahamas, and Puerto Rico.

It is cultivated in warmer climates as an ornamental plant for the attractive bright red berries set against the glossy green leaves. It is known to grow as high as 12 meters (39 ft).

== Stimulant ==
Ilex cassine leaves, like those of its sister species I. vomitoria, contain measurable amounts of the stimulants caffeine and theobromine. The leaves of both species may have been used in the Native American cassena (the Black drink), and there has been confusion in the literature as to which species was commonly used to brew the drink, but I. vomitoria provides more caffeine and was probably the usual ingredient in cassena.

An analysis of the levels of methylxanthines in the leaves used in various stimulant drinks found that I. cassine leaves have about 20% (by dry weight) of the amount of caffeine found in I. vomitoria, 8% of that in Coffea arabica, and about 3% of the caffeine in Camellia sinensis Kunze. I. cassine has twice as much theobromine as I. vomitoria and 20% of the level in C. sinensis Kunze (C. arabica does not contain significant amounts of theobromine), but the stimulant effect of theobromine is just 10% of that of caffeine.

The native peoples of Florida used the hollowed-out shells of lightning whelks (Busycon contrarium), a kind of sea snail found on the east and west coasts of Florida, as drinking vessels in their black drink ceremonies.
