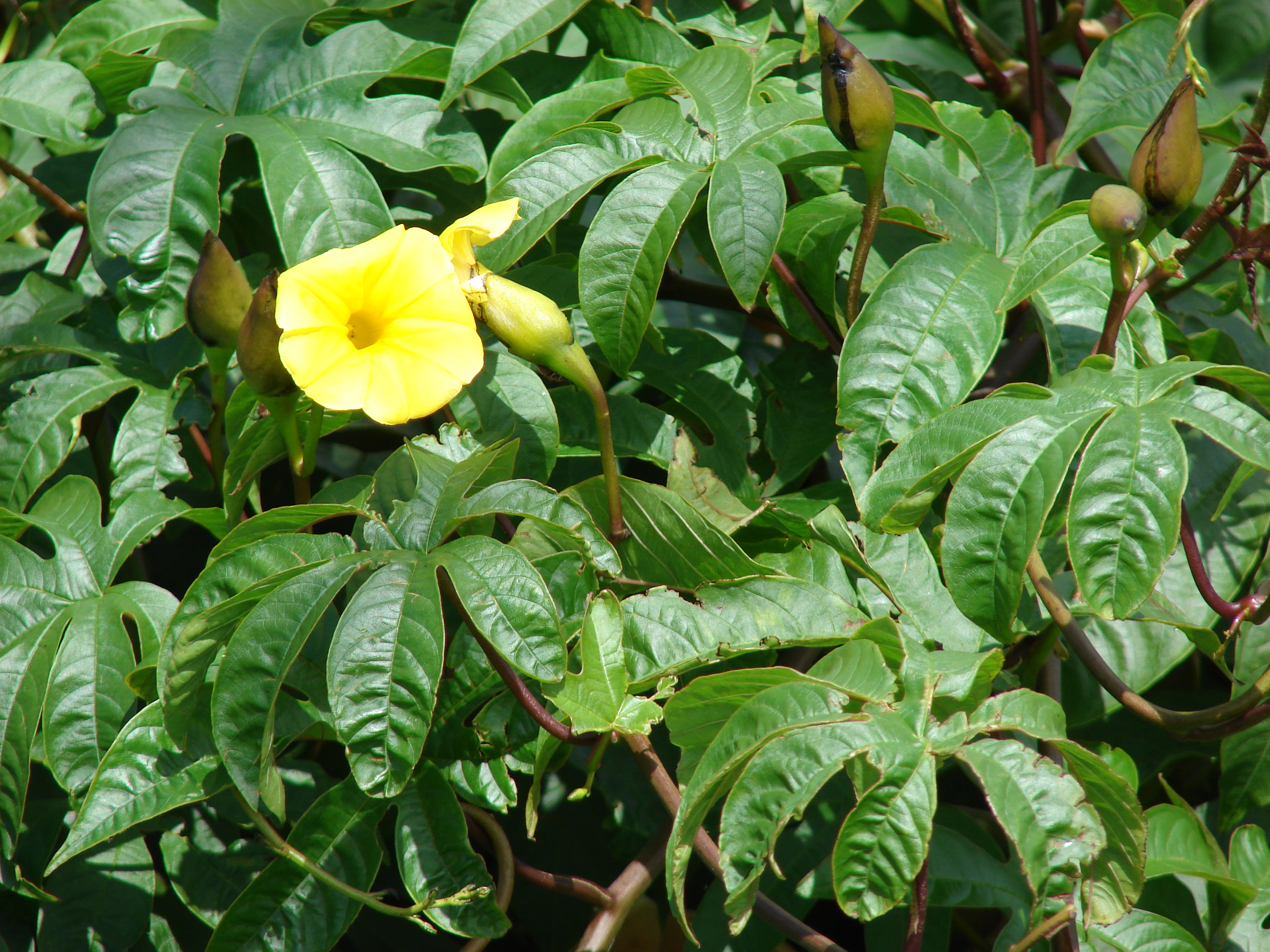

Scientific classification
- Kingdom: Plantae
- Clade: Tracheophytes
- Clade: Angiosperms
- Clade: Eudicots
- Clade: Asterids
- Order: Solanales
- Family: Convolvulaceae
- Genus: Distimake
- Species: D. tuberosus

Binomial name
- Distimake tuberosus (L.) A.R.Simões & Staples

Synonyms
- Batatas tuberosa (L.) Bojer; Convolvulus gossypiifolius Kunth; Convolvulus kentrocaulos Steud. ex Choisy; Convolvulus macrocarpus Spreng.; Convolvulus tuberosus (L.) Spreng.; Ipomoea glaziovii Dammer; Ipomoea mendesii Welw.; Ipomoea nuda Peter; Ipomoea tuberosa L.; Merremia tuberosa Rendle; Operculina tuberosa (L.) Meisn.

= Distimake tuberosus =

Species of plant

Distimake tuberosus, also known as Spanish arborvine or wood rose, commonly known as the Hawaiian wood rose, is a vine in the family Convolvulaceae. It is native to the Americas, from Florida and Texas to Brazil, although considered by the USDA as introduced to the United States. It is an invasive species in a number of islands in the Indian and Pacific Ocean, such as New Caledonia.

Distimake tuberosus is often confused with Argyreia nervosa, which is likewise known by the name "Hawaiian wood rose". It is known by the Hawaiian name pili-kai. Distimake tuberosus is sometimes said to be hallucinogenic similarly to Argyreia nervosa and to have a similar dose of 4 to 8 seeds. However, the psychoactivity of the plant is said to be uncertain. It has also been said to contain no ergoline alkaloids.
