= Alice Shepard Cary =

American physician (born 1920)

- Born: Alice Wellington Shepard; June 2, 1920 (age 106); Gaziantep, Turkey
- Occupation: Physician
- Spouse: Otis Cary
- Father: Lorrin A. Shepard
- Relatives: Fred D. Shepard (grandfather); Fanny Andrews Shepard (grandmother)

Alice Shepard Cary (born June 2, 1920) is an American retired physician and medical missionary, based in Kyoto from 1947 to 1996. She was born into a medical missionary family in Turkey.

== Early life and education ==
Alice Wellington Shepard was born on June 2, 1920 in Gaziantep Province, Turkey, and raised in Istanbul, the daughter of Lorrin A. Shepard and Virginia Moffat Shepard. Her father was a surgeon and director of the American Hospital in Istanbul from 1927 to 1957. Her grandparents were medical missionaries Fred D. Shepard and Fanny Andrews Shepard. She moved to the United States in 1934 to attend Dana Hall School, and she graduated from Wellesley College in 1942, and earned her medical degree from Yale School of Medicine in 1945.

Alice Shepard Cary had an aunt, Alice Claudia Shepard Riggs (1885–1983), and a sister-in-law named Mary Alice Cary Shepard (1925–2021), who were both involved in overseas missions.

== Career ==
Cary served an internship at New Haven Hospital, before moving to Japan with her husband in 1947. While he taught at Doshisha University in Kyoto, she worked in the campus health clinic there. The Carys hosted campus visits from Nobuhito, Prince Takamatsu, Eleanor Roosevelt, and Adlai Stevenson. She joined the staff at Kyoto Baptist Hospital in 1955. She was also medical advisor to the United Church of Christ in Japan. She retired from the hospital in 1993.

Back in the United States in her later years, she lived in Oakland, California, and was a board member of her local chapter of the United Nations Association of America.

== Personal life ==
Shepard married Otis Cary in 1944. He was the son and grandson of missionaries, born in Japan. The Carys had four children, Beth, Ann, Ellen, and Frank. They moved back to the United States in 1996, and Otis Cary died in 2006. She celebrated her 104th birthday in June 2024, at Piedmont Gardens, a retirement home in California.
