= Ergotism =

Effect of long-term ergot poisoning

- Other names: Saint Anthony's fire, ergotoxicosis
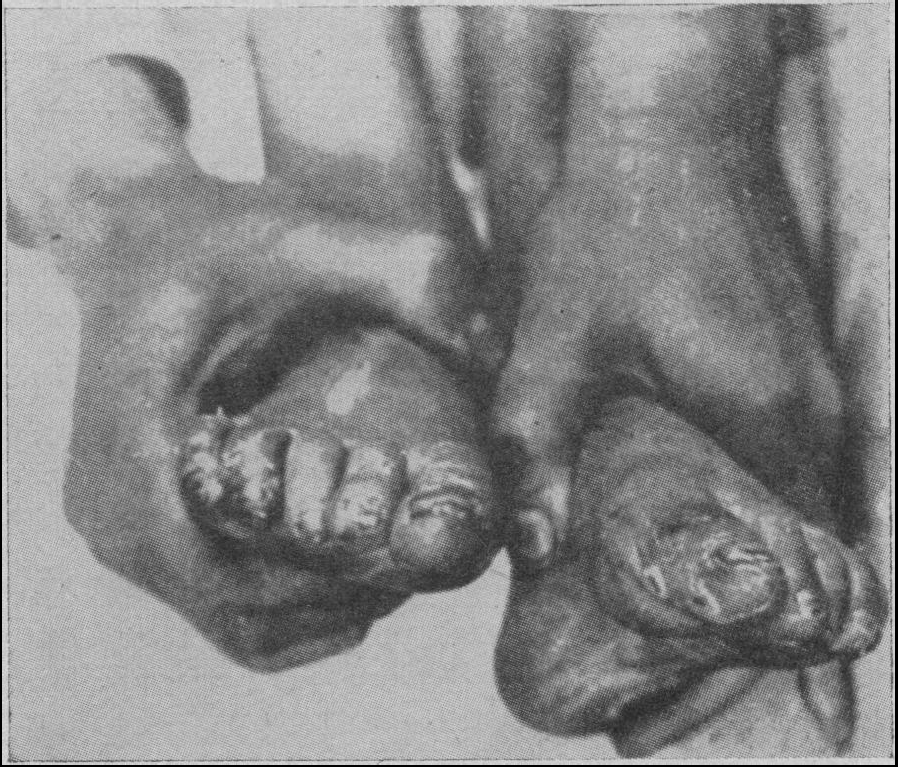
- Advanced ergotism with gangrene
- Specialty: Emergency medicine
- Symptoms: Convulsive ergotism: spasms, diarrhea, paresthesias, mania, psychosis, headaches, nausea, vomiting; Gangrenous ergotism: desquamation, weak peripheral pulses, loss of peripheral sensation, edema
- Types: Convulsive, gangrenous
- Causes: Long-term ergot poisoning

Ergotism (pronounced /ˈɜːrɡətˌɪzəm/ UR-gət-iz-əm) is the effect of long-term ergot poisoning, frequently due to the ingestion of the alkaloids produced by the Claviceps purpurea fungus—from the Latin clava "club" or clavus "nail" and -ceps for "head", i.e. the purple club-headed fungus—that infects rye and other cereals, and more recently by the action of a number of ergoline-based drugs. It is also known as ergotoxicosis, ergot poisoning, and Saint Anthony's fire.

== Signs and symptoms ==
Ergotism is the effect of long-term ergot poisoning. The symptoms can be roughly divided into convulsive symptoms and gangrenous symptoms.

Ergot alkaloids, the active compounds produced by the ergot fungus, can cause severe vasoconstriction, leading to symptoms like gangrene and convulsions. Additionally, ergot alkaloids can mimic neurotransmitters and hormones in the human body, causing hallucinations and affecting hormonal balance. Chronic exposure to some ergot alkaloids has been linked to reproductive issues, such as spontaneous abortions and infertility, due to their action on the pituitary gland.

=== Convulsive ===
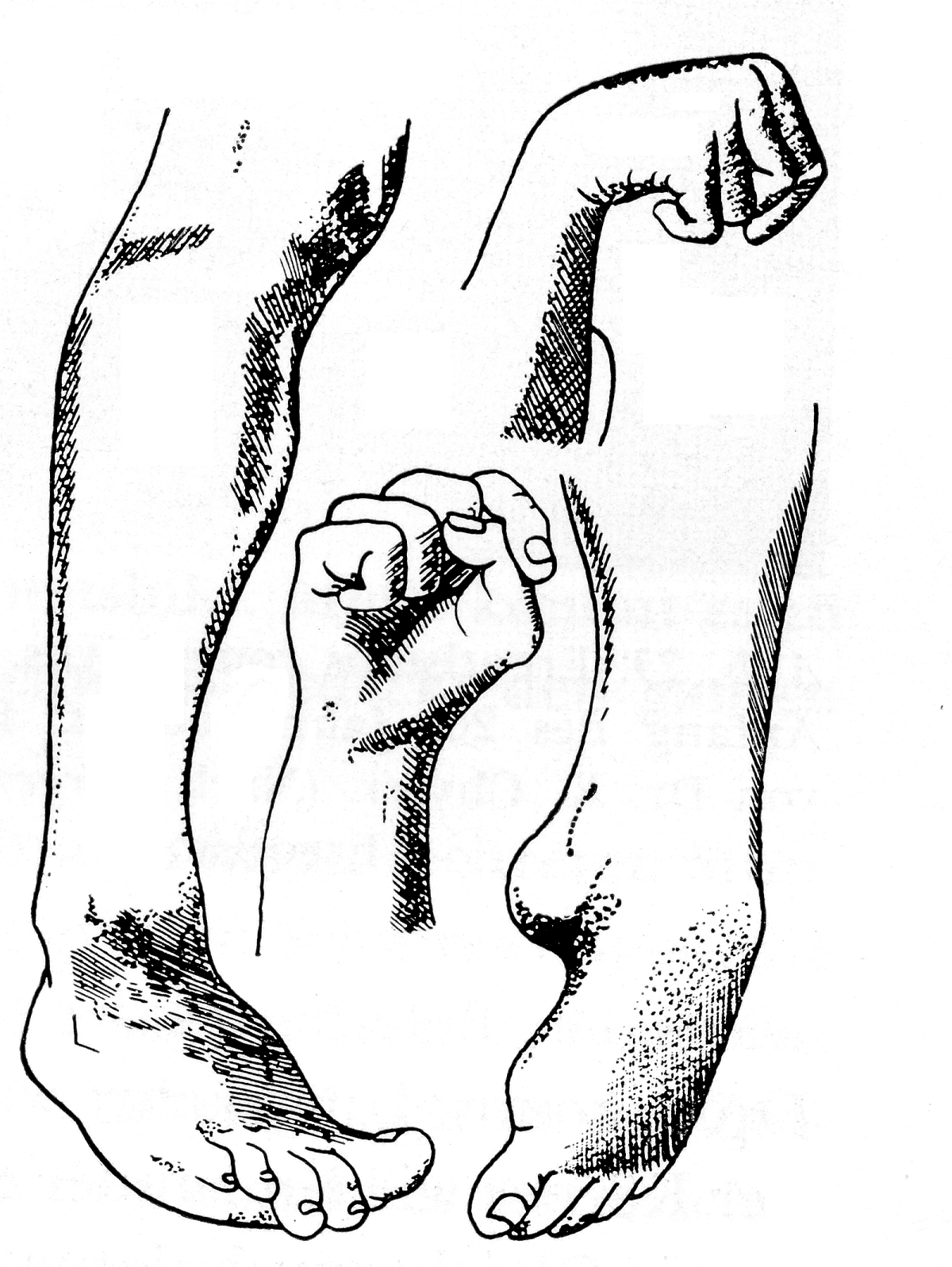
Convulsive symptoms of ergotism

Convulsive ergotism can cause seizures and muscle spasms, gastrointestinal symptoms such as diarrhea, nausea and vomiting, sensory disturbances including paresthesia and itching, headaches, and psychiatric symptoms such as mania or psychosis. Gastrointestinal symptoms may precede neurological manifestations.

=== Gangrenous ===
The dry gangrene is a result of vasoconstriction induced by the ergotamine-ergocristine alkaloids of the fungus. It affects the more poorly vascularized distal structures, such as the fingers and toes. Symptoms include desquamation or peeling, weak peripheral pulses, loss of peripheral sensation, edema and ultimately the death and loss of affected tissues. Vasoconstriction is treated with vasodilators.

== Causes ==
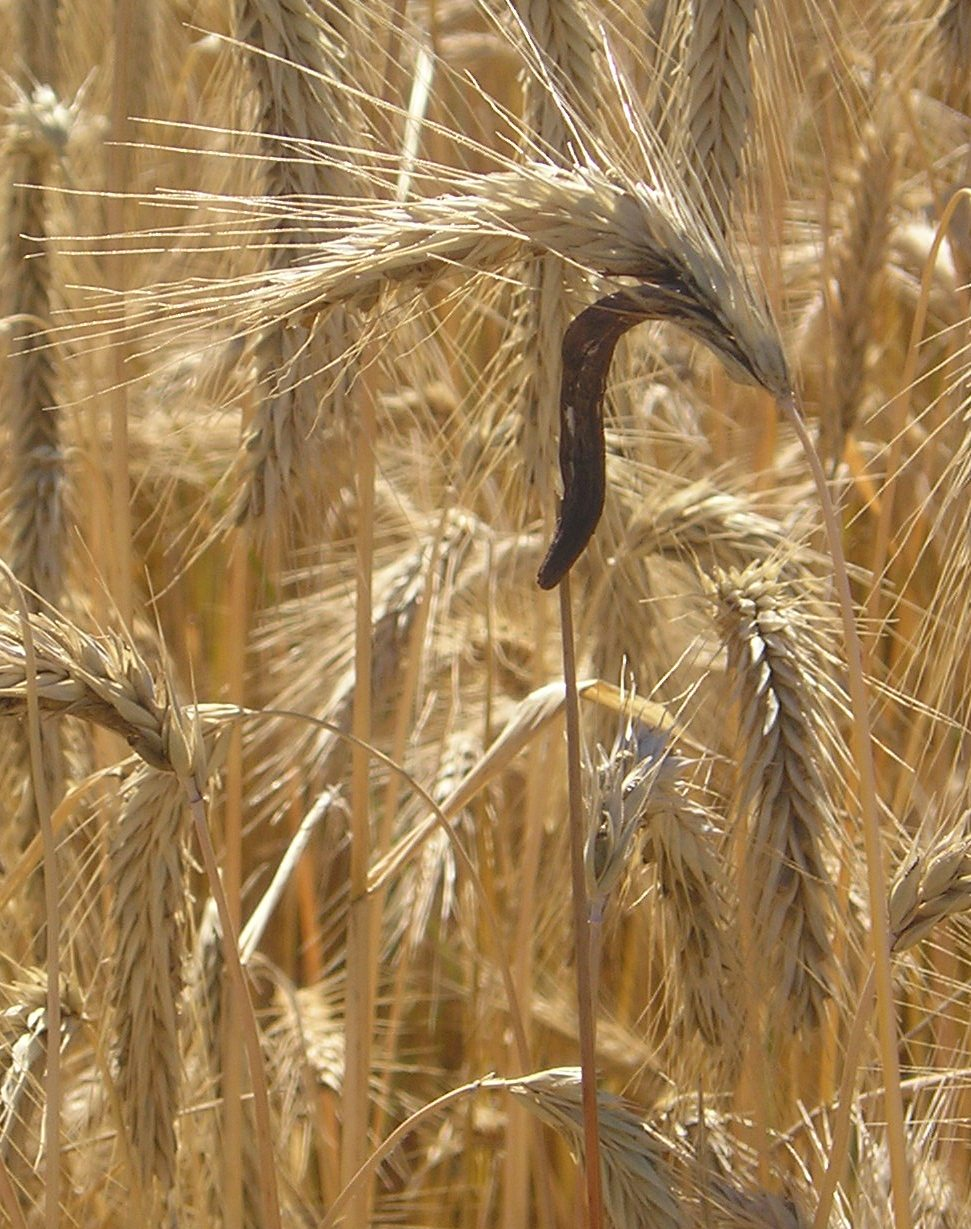
Claviceps purpurea fungal sclerotium growing on barley

Historically, eating grain products, particularly rye, contaminated with the fungus Claviceps purpurea was the cause of ergotism.

The toxic ergoline derivatives are found in ergot-based drugs (such as methylergometrine, ergotamine or, previously, ergotoxine). The deleterious side effects occur either under high dose or when moderate doses interact with potentiators, such as erythromycin.

The alkaloids can pass through lactation from mother to child, causing ergotism in infants.

=== Identification of agent ===
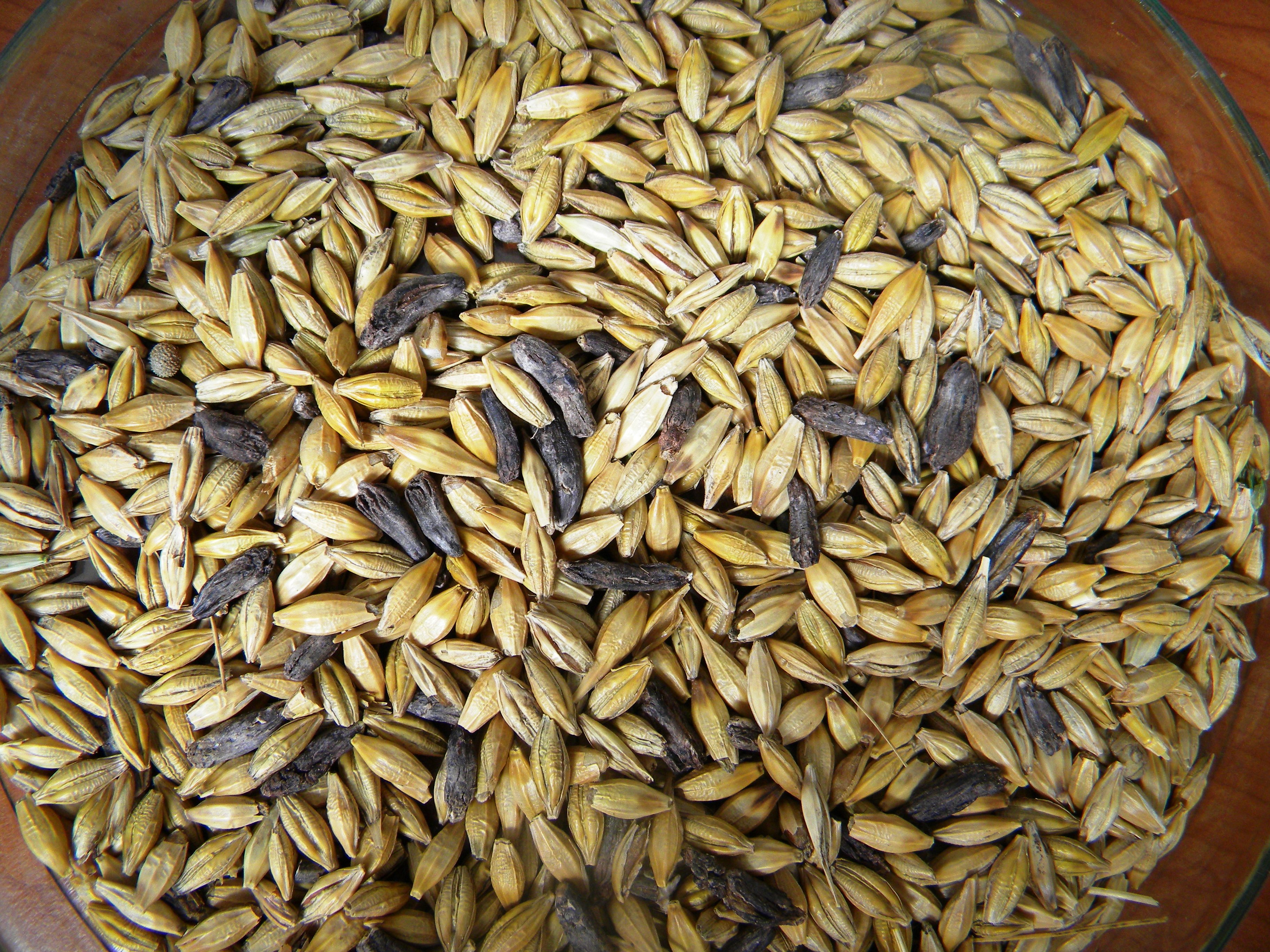
Ergot in barley

Dark-purple or black grain kernels, known as ergot bodies, can be identifiable in the heads of cereal or grass just before harvest. In most plants the ergot bodies are larger than normal grain kernels, but can be smaller if the grain is a type of wheat.

== Prevention ==
Removal of ergot bodies is done by placing the yield in a brine solution; the ergot bodies float, while the healthy grains sink. Infested fields must be deep-ploughed; ergot cannot germinate if buried more than one inch (2.5 cm) in soil and therefore will not release its spores into the air. Crop rotation with non-susceptible plants helps reduce infestations, since ergot spores live only one year. Wild and escaped grasses and pastures can be mown before they flower to help limit spread of the fungus.

Chemical controls can also be used but are not considered economical, especially in commercial operations, and germination of ergot spores can still occur under favourable conditions even with the use of such controls.

== History ==
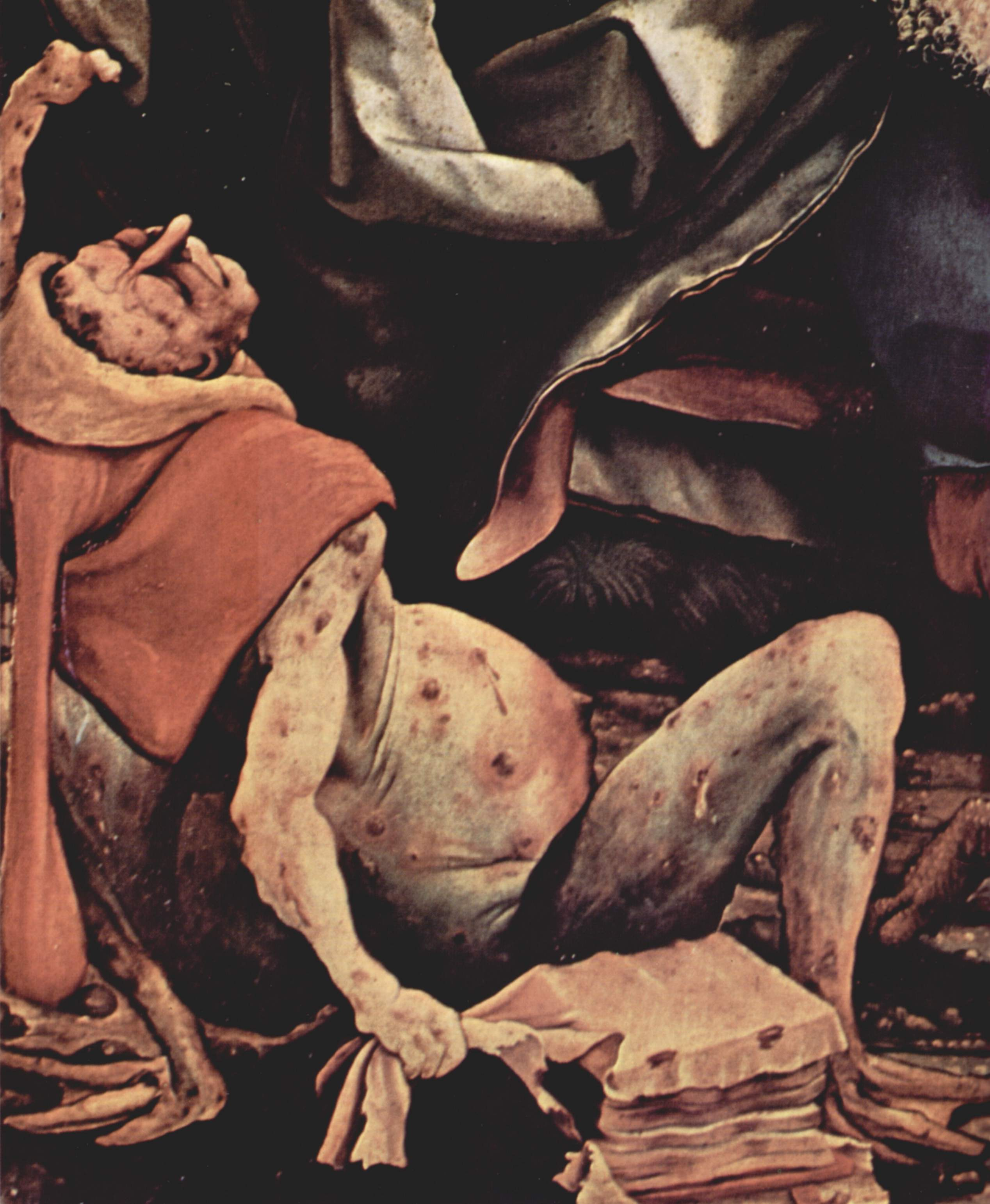
Detail from the painting Temptation of St Anthony by Matthias Grünewald, showing a patient with advanced ergotism

Throughout history, at least 83 outbreaks of ergotism have been documented, particularly in Europe. One of the most notable incidents occurred in 944 AD in France, where ergot poisoning led to widespread hallucinations, gangrene, and convulsions. Another possible case is associated with the Salem witch trials in 1692, where some historians believe ergotism may have contributed to the symptoms reported by the accusers.

Epidemics of the disease were identified throughout history, though the references in classical writings are inconclusive. Rye, the main vector (route) for transmitting ergotism, was not grown much around the Mediterranean. When Fuchs separated references to ergotism from erysipelas and other conditions in 1834, he found the earliest reference to ergotism in the Annales Xantenses for the year 857: "a great plague of swollen blisters consumed the people by a loathsome rot, so that their limbs were loosened and fell off before death".

In the Middle Ages the gangrenous poisoning was known as "holy fire" or "Saint Anthony's fire", named after monks of the Order of St. Anthony, who dedicated themselves to treating this ailment. According to Snorri Sturluson in his Heimskringla, King Magnus II of Norway, son of King Harald Sigurtharson, who was the half-brother of Saint King Olaf Haraldsson, died from ergotism shortly after the Battle of Hastings. The 12th-century chronicler Geoffroy du Breuil of Vigeois recorded the mysterious outbreaks in the Limousin region of France, where the gangrenous form of ergotism was associated with the local Saint Martial. Likewise, an outbreak in Paris around 1129 was reported to be cured by the relics of Saint Genevieve, a miracle commemorated in the 26 November "Feast of the Burning Ones." The French physician Tessier observed a huge epidemic in the year 1778 in Sologne (France), during which more than 8000 people died, and was hence persuaded to recommend drainage of fields, compulsory cleaning of grain and replacement of infected grain with potatoes.

Notable epidemics of ergotism occurred into the first half of the 20th century, as in the Italian island of Alicudi, although fewer outbreaks have occurred in modern times owing to rye being carefully monitored in developed countries. However, a severe outbreak of something akin to ergot poisoning occurred in the French village of Pont-Saint-Esprit in 1951, resulting in nearly 250 people affected and seven deaths. The outbreak and the diagnostic confusion surrounding it are vividly described in John Grant Fuller's book The Day of St Anthony's Fire.

Ergot sclerotiums were found in the gut of the Grauballe Man, a bog body dated the late 3rd century BC.

Poisonings due to consumption of seeds treated with mercury compounds are sometimes misidentified as ergotism. There have been numerous cases of mass-poisoning due to consumption of mercury-treated seeds.

=== Salem witchcraft accusations ===
The convulsive symptoms from ergot-tainted rye may have been the source of accusations of bewitchment that spurred the Salem witch trials. This medical explanation for the theory of "bewitchment" was first propounded by Linnda R. Caporael in 1976 in an article in Science. In her article, Caporael argues that the convulsive symptoms such as crawling sensations in the skin, tingling in the fingers, vertigo, tinnitus aurium, headaches, disturbances in sensation, hallucination, painful muscular contractions, vomiting, and diarrhea, as well as psychological symptoms such as mania, melancholia, psychosis, and delirium, were all symptoms reported in the Salem witchcraft records. Caporael also states that there was an abundance of rye in the region, as well as climate conditions that could support the tainting of rye. In 1982, historian Mary Matossian raised Caporael's theory in an article in American Scientist, in which she argued that symptoms of "bewitchment" resemble the ones exhibited in those affected by ergot poisoning.

The hypothesis that ergotism could explain cases of bewitchment has been subject to significant debate and has been criticized by several scholars. Within a year of Caporael's article, historians Nicholas Spanos and Jack Gottlieb refuted the idea in the same journal. In Spanos and Gottlieb's rebuttal to Caporael's article, they concluded that there are several flaws in the explanation. They noted that if ergotism was present in Salem, the symptoms would have occurred by household, not individual. Whole families, and particularly all the young children in a household, would have shown symptoms, but this was not the case. In general, the proportion of children affected was significantly less than in a typical ergotism epidemic. Spanos and Gottlieb also state that most of ergot poisoning's symptoms, like crawling and tingling sensations, vertigo, tinnitus, vomiting, and diarrhea, do not appear in the records of events in Salem. Lastly, they note that convulsive ergotism epidemics only take place in communities suffering from vitamin A deficiencies; they argued that residents of Salem, living in a farming community with ample access to dairy, would have had no reason to be deficient in vitamin A. Therefore, an outbreak of ergotism as the cause of the Salem epidemic was unlikely. Historians published in the early 21st century continue to stand by Spanos and Gottlieb's conclusion.

Historian Leon Harrier has argued that only some members of a household might have shown symptoms because they had underlying conditions. Being chemically similar to lysergic acid diethylamide (LSD), ergot would not survive in the acidic environment of a typical human's stomach, especially in properly cooked food. But if some residents of a household were malnourished and had bleeding stomach ulcers, those individuals would have had a heightened risk of absorbing the toxin (even with properly cooked food items) through the stomach lining, offering a direct route to the bloodstream. Only those with these preexisting conditions would have been affected by ingesting contaminated grains, leaving the majority unaffected.

Anthropologist H. Sidky noted that ergotism had been known for centuries before the Salem witch trials and argued that its symptoms would have been recognizable during the time of the Salem witch trials.

In 2003 it was pointed out that ergots produced by different strains of Claviceps purpurea, as well as those growing in different soils, may produce different ergot alkaloid compositions. This may explain the different manifestations of ergotism in different outbreaks. For example, an alkaloid present in high concentrations in ergots from Europe east of the Rhine may have caused convulsive ergotism, while ergot from the west caused epidemics of gangrenous ergotism.

== Cultural and religious beliefs ==
In medieval Europe, outbreaks of ergotism were sometimes interpreted as divine punishment or witchcraft. The condition's symptoms, particularly hallucinations and convulsions, often led to accusations of demonic possession. The disease's association with St. Anthony's Fire is linked to the Order of St. Anthony, a medieval Christian order that provided care for ergotism sufferers.

== Environmental factors ==
The prevalence of ergotism was closely linked to environmental conditions, such as cold, damp weather, which promoted the growth of the ergot fungus. Poor storage of grain also contributed to the risk of contamination. Changes in agricultural practices and the introduction of disease-resistant crop varieties have largely eliminated ergotism in modern times.

== See also ==
- Dancing mania
- Dancing plague of 1518
- Great Fear of 1789
