= 100 Armenian Tales and Their Folkloristic Relevance =

100 Armenian Tales and Their Folkloristic Relevance is a 1966 non-fiction book edited by Susie Hoogasian Villa, published by Wayne State University Press.

Villa approached Armenian Americans in Detroit and noted the folklore they told.

== Background ==
Villa was Armenian American, and her parents were born in Armenia.

== Contents ==
Thelma James wrote the foreword.

In addition to the folktales, it includes an essay on the Armenian Americans in Metro Detroit and how their stories were affected by the location, as well as an essay on how scholarship of the Armenian people in general intersects with these folktales. The book also includes appendices and notes that show comparison.

== Reception ==
Ernest W. Baughman of the University of New Mexico stated that the work was "beautifully made", that it is "nearly monumental in its accomplishments", and that it would interest a member of the public and someone in academia.

Reviewer K. M. Briggs wrote that "This book is an example of what a collection of folk-tales should be." Briggs praised the "range" of the stories.

== See also ==
- Armenian Village Life Before 1914 - Book cowritten by Villa and Mary Kilbourne Matossian
