= Lorrin A. Shepard =

American physician and missionary (1890–1983)

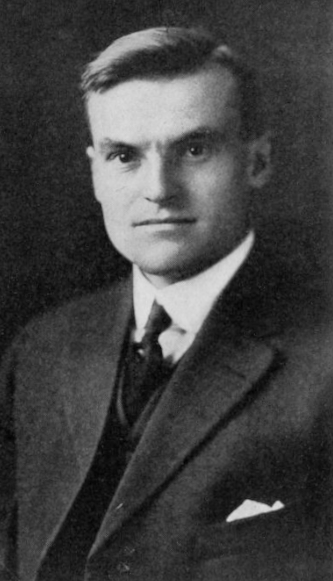
- At Yale in 1914
- Born: Lorrin Andrews Shepard; March 24, 1890; Antep, Ottoman Empire
- Died: July 16, 1983 (aged 93); Haverhill, Massachusetts, US
- Education: Yale University; Columbia University College of Physicians and Surgeons
- Occupations: Missionary, physician

Lorrin Andrews Shepard (March 24, 1890 – July 16, 1983) was an American medical missionary who served as the chief physician at the American Hospital in Istanbul from 1927 to 1957.

== Biography ==
Born in Antep, Ottoman Empire, he was the son of Fred D. Shepard, a surgeon at Antep American Hospital, and Fanny Andrews Shepard, a physician who worked as a nurse and founded a vocational workshop due to local prohibitions on female physicians.

Shepard completed his education in the United States, attending Yale University for his undergraduate studies and Columbia University for medical school. Following a surgical residency at Bellevue Hospital in New York, he succeeded his late father as chief physician at the American Hospital in Istanbul in 1927. During his tenure, he oversaw the planning and construction of the hospital's Nişantaşı building in 1939 and the Admiral Bristol Nursing School in 1949.

After retiring in 1957, Shepard returned to the United States where he directed the Yale University Foreign Students Centre and managed the cataloging of the university's Ottoman Manuscripts Collection. He died in Haverhill, Massachusetts, in 1983. His daughter Alice Shepard Cary was a medical missionary in Kyoto, and married to professor Otis Cary.
