= Lorrin =

Lorrin is a masculine given name. Notable people with the name include:

- Lorrin A. Cooke (1831–1902), American politician
- Lorrin A. Shepard (1890–1983), American medical missionary
- Lorrin A. Thurston (1858–1931), Hawaiian lawyer, politician, and businessman
- Lorrin Andrews (1795–1868), American missionary and judge
- Lorrin Harrison (1913–1993), American surfer
