= Corinna Shattuck =

American educator (1848–1910)

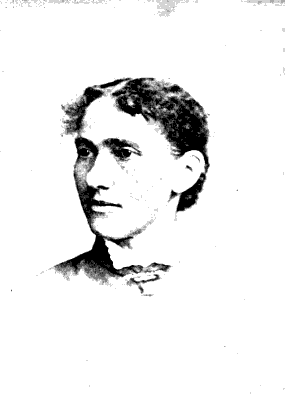
Corinna Shattuck, from a 1910 publication.

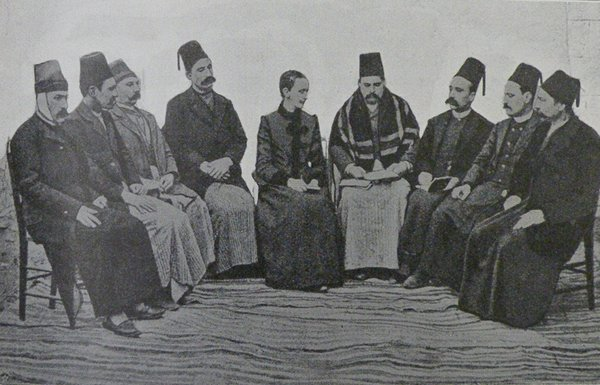
Corinna Shattuck meeting with leaders at Urfa, from a 1900 publication.

Corinna Shattuck (April 21, 1848 – May 22, 1910) was an American educator and missionary in Turkey, recognized for heroism at Urfa in 1895–1896.

== Early life ==
Corinna Shattuck was born in Louisville, Kentucky in 1848. After her parents died, she was raised by her grandparents in South Acton, Massachusetts. She trained as a teacher in Massachusetts, at the Framingham State Normal School.

== Career ==
In 1873, Shattuck was sent by the American Board of Commissioners for Foreign Missions to Turkey, where she remained for most of the next 37 years. She set up kindergartens, girls' schools, orphanages, a school for blind students, and vocational training programs at Urfa, and coordinated relief efforts in that city. She worked with Fannie Perkins Shepard to establish a business called Industries for Women and Girls that helped provide work to thousands of women and girls. She described her work with Armenian refugees at Urfa in a letter published in The Washington Post in 1896: "We are now dispensing coffee, 800 pounds having been given to us by the Red Cross people. We are also giving out shoes for the widows and orphans, arranging for their rents, and setting up the different tradesmen in work," she wrote. She arranged for braille editions of Armenian texts, including the Bible, to be produced, and sponsored a young blind Armenian woman, Mara Haratounian, to attend college in England.

In January 1896, she helped to prevent a massacre of Armenian women and children in her care at Urfa, by standing in front of her church and school (some versions of the story have her holding an American flag in one hand) and challenging the Turkish forces to attack her personally. Six Turkish officials protected Shattuck from the "angry mob". The incident was fictionalized in an 1899 novel, By Far Euphrates by Deborah Alcock.

== Personal life ==
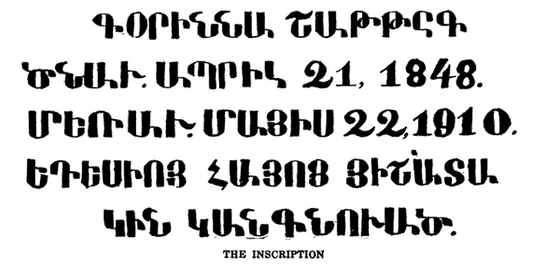
The Armenian inscription on Corinna Shattuck's tombstone in Newton, Massachusetts.

Shattuck returned to the United States in ill health in 1910, and died soon after from tuberculosis, at Massachusetts General Hospital, aged 62 years. A bronze plaque in her memory was dedicated in 1915 at Framingham State Normal School. Her tombstone in Newton, Massachusetts is inscribed in English and Armenian.
