= 1951 Pont-Saint-Esprit mass poisoning =

Ergot poisoning incident in France

Location of Pont-Saint-Esprit in France

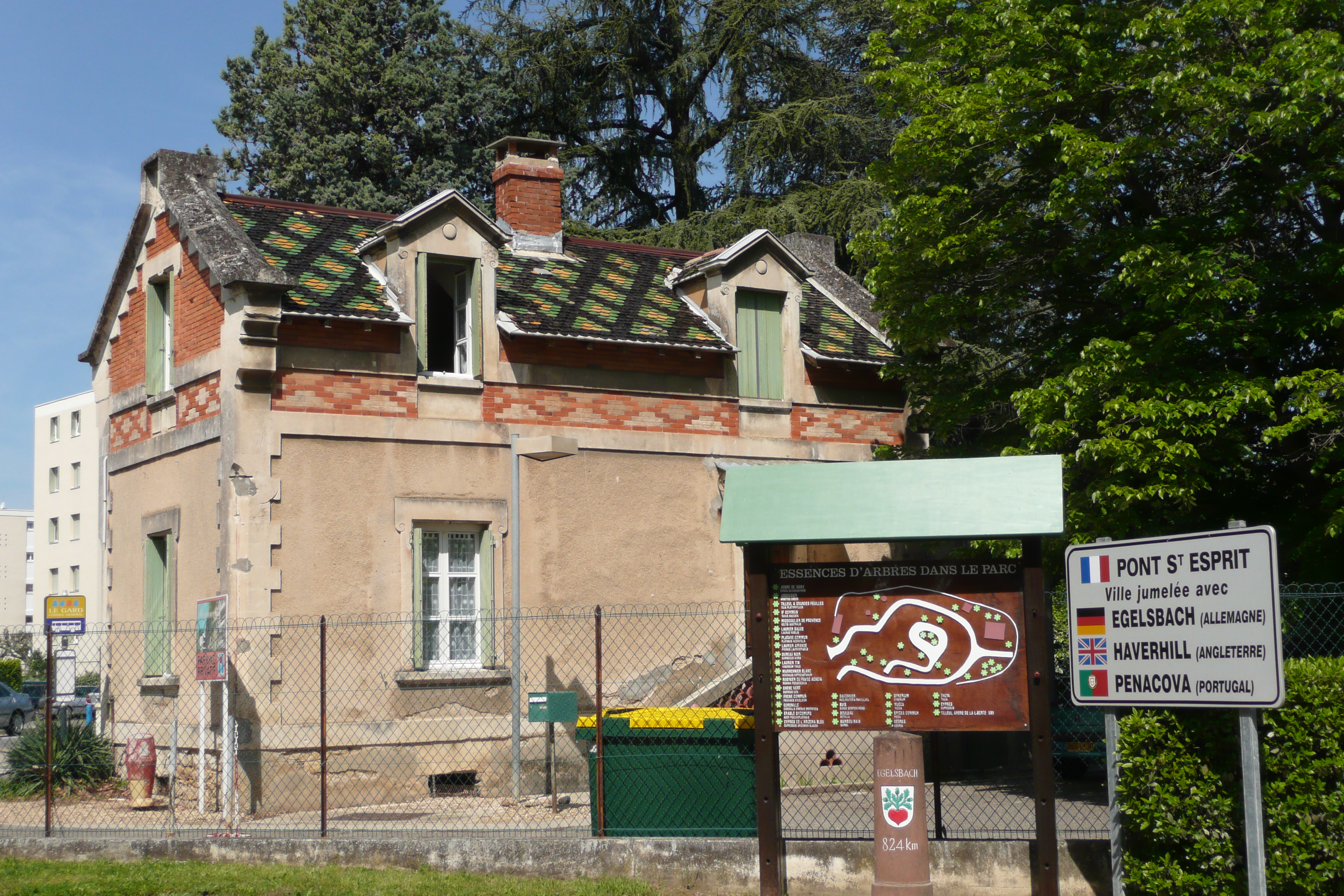
Pont Saint Esprit building and sign

The 1951 Pont-Saint-Esprit mass poisoning, known in French as Le Pain Maudit, took place on 15 August 1951, in the small town of Pont-Saint-Esprit in Southern France. More than 250 people were involved, including 50 people interned in asylums, and there were seven deaths. A foodborne illness was suspected; among these it was originally believed to be a case of "cursed bread" (pain maudit).

A majority of academic sources accept naturally occurring ergot poisoning as the cause of the epidemic, while a few theorise other causes such as poisoning by mercury, mycotoxins, or nitrogen trichloride.

== Background ==
During the Vichy government, the supply of grains from field to mill to bakery was directed by the government's grain control board, the Office National Interprofessionnel des Céréales (ONIC), and later the Union Meunière. Essentially, this created a government monopoly on the sale of flour, allowing the government a measure of control over wartime supply shortages. This also meant that flour would be purchased directly from ONIC, and delivered to the baker for a set price, without the baker having any control on quality. Following the end of the second world war, this system was relaxed, allowing for bakers to have some choice over their flour supply. ONIC retained its monopoly on inter-departmental exportation and importation. By this system, millers in departments with more supply than demand could sell the excess to ONIC. In practice, this meant that the higher-quality flour would be delivered to local bakers and lower-quality flour would be exported to other departments. Thus, departments with net flour deficits, like the Gard department in which Pont-Saint-Esprit was located, would be supplied with lower-quality flour from other departments via ONIC, with the bakers having virtually no choice of the provenance or quality of their flour.

=== Previous sanitary events ===
In the weeks preceding the outbreak, several villages near Pont-Saint-Esprit reported outbreaks of food poisoning via bread. These outbreaks were all linked to bakeries that made their bread with most if not all of their flour supplied by the mill of Maurice Maillet, in Saint-Martin-la-Riviere. The symptoms reported were milder than those reported in Pont-Saint-Esprit.

At Issirac, at least 20 people reported cutaneous eruptions, diarrhea, vomiting and headaches. Similar symptoms were reported in Laval-Saint-Roman. Multiple families were reported sick in Goudargues and Lamotte-du-Rhone.

In Connaux, the town's baker received reports from his clients that they believed his bread was causing violent diarrhea. He reported that his family, as well as himself, were all suffering from the same afflictions. The baker was quick to blame his flour, which he described as “bad, forming a sticky dough with acid fermentation” and which made gray and sticky bread.

In Saint-Geniès-de-Comolas, the town's mayor was alerted by one of the town's two bakers that he received flour that was gray and full of worms. The mayor banned making bread with that flour, and referred the situation to the region's prefect, as well as to the driver that delivered the flour.

The delivery driver, Jean Bousquet, sent the prefect a copy of a remark made to his employer, the miller's union in Nimes, on 9 August. The note said that "almost every baker of Centre de Bagnols-sur-Cèze has complained of the quality of the flour provided by Mr. Maillet". Following the incident at Connaux, Bousquet requested immediate written instructions from his employer regarding the situation. On the 13th of August, he requested that samples be taken to determine if the flour was contaminated. During this period, 42 bakers complained of the flour delivered by Bousquet.

== Mass poisoning ==
On 16 August 1951, the local offices of the town's two doctors filled with patients reporting similar food poisoning symptoms: nausea, vomiting, cold chills, heat waves. These symptoms eventually worsened, with added hallucinatory crises and convulsions. The situation in the town deteriorated in the following days. On the night of 24 August, a man believed himself to be an aeroplane and died by jumping from a second-story window, and an 11-year-old boy tried to strangle his mother. One of the town's two doctors would name the night nuit d'apocalypse; apocalyptic night.

=== Epidemiological investigation ===
Doctors Vieu and Gabbai investigated the epidemiology of the disease. On 19 August, they came to the conclusion that bread was to blame; all patients interrogated had purchased their bread at the Briand bakery in Pont-Saint-Esprit. In a family from a neighboring village, four of whose nine members fell ill, all members who ate bread from the Briand bakery fell ill, whereas none of the others who ate bread from another bakery did. Another family shared a loaf of Briand's bread among five of its seven members. The other two preferred biscottes (rusks in English) and only the five fell ill.

On the morning of the 20th, the health service, the prefecture, the prosecutor of the Republic and the police were notified. Roch Briand was interrogated, and the sickness in the town was blamed on his bread.

== Criminal investigation ==
The police investigation would eventually center on the second of three batches of bread made at Briand's bakery on the day of 16 August. The flour composition of each batch varied, as having run out of flour during the preparation of the second batch, Briand had borrowed flour from two other local bakers, Jaussent and Fallavet. Briand's assistant stated that when he picked up flour from Jaussent, the baker was out ill, and that he took the flour from his assistant instead.

Both Briand and his assistant agreed that the first batch was constituted of the previous day's flour mixed with flour borrowed from Jaussent. They disagreed on the second and third batches. Whereas Briand stated that the second was made with Jaussent's flour and the third with Fallavet's flour, the assistant stated that both latter batches were made with a mix of the two.

The investigation led police to interrogate many of the town's residents, who gave inconsistent ratings of Briand's tainted batch. Some reported that the taste was perfectly normal, while others reported chemical smells (one described an odor of gasoline, another of bleach). Some reported that the bread looked normal, while others stated that its appearance was grayish.

=== Inquiry ===
On the 23rd of August, a judge of inquiry opened a formal investigation, and tasked commissaire Georges Sigaud with finding the cause of the mass poisoning event.

The tainted bread made by Briand was made with only four ingredients: flour, yeast, water and salt. All of the ingredients but the flour could be easily discounted as sources of the illness. The water used to make the bread was from a municipal source, the same that also supplied the rest of the village. Both the salt and the yeast used by Briand were sourced from the same suppliers as all other bakers in the region, and subsequent testing of the supplies found no toxicity.

The investigation of the provenance of the flour led Sigaud to the UM-Gard flour distribution centre, in Bagnols-sur-Cèze. The chief of the distribution network, Jean Bousquet, stated that since the end of July, the vast majority of the flour supplying the region was from two mills; one in Châtillon-sur-Indre, and the other being the mill of Maurice Maillet in Saint-Martin-la-Rivière, the latter of which was the subject of numerous complaints about the quality of its flour.

=== Maurice Maillet ===
In an interrogation that lasted multiple hours, Maurice Maillet denied mixing rye (which is highly susceptible to ergot) into his flour, stating that he opted instead to cut his product with 2% of bean flour. This was unusual, given that owing to a shortage of wheat, the grain control board, ONIC, had mandated that rye flour be mixed in. However, in the Vienne department, rye of good quality was often more expensive than wheat, and accordingly, bean flour was authorised by ONIC as a replacement.

Despite this, it came to light that the supply of grains to be milled for export was sometimes mixed with grains milled in an informal agreement called échangisme. Under this type of agreement, often practiced at the time, a farmer would bring a baker grain he grew himself in exchange for bread that would later be made with his grain. The baker would bring the grain to the miller, who would mill it. The miller and baker would each take a cut for sale.

During the interrogation, Maillet admitted that he had made a deal with a baker, Guy Bruère, who had brought in bags to be milled. Since this was near the end of the season, the bags were filled with leftover grain that sometimes contained a high proportion of rye. The rye was not the only problem with the flour, as the miller also noted the presence of weevils, mites and dust. The baker was concerned that he would lose business should he refuse the grain on the basis of quality. Despite the miller having noticed the low quality of the grains, he agreed to exchange the grain for a lower quantity of flour already milled from grain marked for export. Given that the quantity of lower-quality grain was much lower than that of the grain for export, the miller thought that it would be possible to mix it all without reducing the overall quality of the flour.

== Arrests and trial ==
On August 31, around 14:30, Sigaud addressed the media, announcing the arrests of Maillet and Bruère for involuntary manslaughter and involuntary injuries arising from their negligence in trading improper flour. Further arrests were made in the following days: an employee of Maillet, André Bertrand, was arrested, but released on bail as he was the head of a family of nine whose wife was about to give birth. The owners of the bakery at which Bruère was employed, Clothaire and Denise Audidier, were also arrested for infractions of fiscal legislation and of legislation governing wheat and flour.

== Scientific publishing ==
Shortly after the incident, in September 1951, Dr. Gabbai and colleagues published a paper in the British Medical Journal declaring that "the outbreak of poisoning" was produced by ergot fungus. The victims appeared to have one common connection. They had eaten bread from the bakery of Roch Briand, who was subsequently blamed for having used flour made from contaminated rye. Animals who had eaten the bread were also found to have perished. According to reports at the time, the flour had been contaminated by the fungus Claviceps purpurea (ergot), which produces alkaloids that are structurally similar to the hallucinogenic drug lysergic acid diethylamide (LSD).

== Other theories ==
Later investigations suggested mercury poisoning due to the use of Panogen or other fungicides to treat grain and seeds.

This type of contamination was considered owing to the presence of fluorescent stains on the outside of some used empty flour bags returned to the distributor. Panogen was sold containing a red colorant as a safety measure, to ensure that seeds coated with it would be used only for planting. Subsequent scientific tests showed that this coloring would not penetrate flour bags but that the active ingredient could do so. This would allow contamination of the flour, but it would appear to be limited to the bags. Further testing showed that if bread were to be baked using Panogen-contaminated flour, the rising of the bread could be partially or totally inhibited, depending on the concentration. This hypothesis was considered thoroughly in a French civil trial arising from the accident, with the contamination mechanism being a train wagon carrying flour that could have previously carried concentrated cylinders of Panogen intended for agricultural uses. It was later discovered that pre-treating the seeds in Panogen could lead to mercury accumulation in the plants growing from those seeds. For this reason, Panogen, made by a Swedish company, was banned in Sweden in 1966. A revised version of the ban, in 1970, would prohibit the exportation of Panogen, leading to its removal from the market.

In 1982, a French researcher suggested Aspergillus fumigatus, a toxic fungus produced in grain silos, as a potential culprit.

Historian Steven Kaplan's 2008 book Le Pain Maudit states that the poisoning might have been caused by nitrogen trichloride used to artificially (and illegally) bleach flour.

In his 2009 book A Terrible Mistake, the investigative journalist Hank P. Albarelli Jr writes that the Special Operations Division of the Central Intelligence Agency (CIA) tested the use of LSD on the population of Pont-Saint-Esprit as part of its MKNAOMI biological warfare program, in a field test called "Project SPAN". According to Albarelli, this is based on CIA documents held in the US National Archives and a document supplied to the 1975 Rockefeller Commission that investigated CIA activities. The attribution of the poisoning to the CIA in Albarelli's book has been criticized. Historian Steven Kaplan, author of an earlier book about the events, said that this would be "clinically incoherent: LSD takes effects in just a few hours, whereas the inhabitants showed symptoms only after 36 hours or more. Furthermore, LSD does not cause the digestive ailments or the vegetative effects described by the townspeople." Kaplan made no reference to Hank Albarelli's assertion that mass dousing via aerosol spray had also happened in Pont-Saint-Esprit, which would negate the slow poisoning via grain supply contamination. According to Mary's Mosaic by Peter Janney, the dispersal over the village took place using a crop-duster type airplane, as had happened elsewhere with U.S. Army aerosol tests over civilian neighbourhoods such as Operation LAC and related Army and CIA programs based at chemical and biological warfare laboratory of Fort Detrick, Maryland. A Terrible Mistake also mentions of a supposed low-flying unmarked aircraft on the morning of the outbreak. For his assertions Albarelli uses transcripts of a conversation between the CIA and the Swiss laboratory Sandoz personnel, where LSD was invented, located 100 miles from Pont-Saint-Esprit in over the border city of Basel.

== In popular culture ==
Barbara Comyns wrote her third novel, Who Was Changed and Who Was Dead (1954), after reading about the poisoning.

Sophie Mackintosh's third novel, Cursed Bread (2023) is based on the poisoning.
