= Armenian Village Life Before 1914 =

1982 non-fiction book by Susie Hoogasian Villa and Mary Kilbourne Matossian

Armenian Village Life Before 1914 is a non-fiction book by Susie Hoogasian Villa and Mary Kilbourne Matossian, published in 1982 by Wayne State University Press.

The authors interviewed Armenian immigrants living in Metro Detroit. They recalled their lives prior to the Armenian genocide.

== Background ==
Villa had edited 100 Armenian Tales and Their Folkloristic Relevance, a book that had Armenian folktales, and had attended the Folklore Institute of Indiana University so she could learn about folklore. Villa died in 1978. Matossian worked as a historian at the University of Maryland.

There were 48 interview subjects. Most of the interviews occurred in the 1970s and up to the date of publication of the book. Some interviews from the 1940s were used; Villa had conducted the 1940s interviews. The historical sourcing included studies of the anthropology of the area in areas near Ottoman Armenia as well as narratives of trabeling in the region and ethnography documents made by Soviet ethnic Armenians.

Matossian completed the work after obtaining the manuscript by adding sourcing.

Villa had sent the manuscript of the book to the publisher which allowed other people to complete the work. The publisher then asked Matossian to finish the book. Villa and Matossian never met one another.

== Content ==
The chapters are organized thematically.

Biographies of the interviewees are stated at the end of the work.

== Reception ==
Avakian and Halpern wrote that the work is "an excellent beginning" to documenting the lives of families of pre-genocide Armenian settlements in the Ottoman Empire.

Daniel G. Bates of Hunter College described the work as a "labor of love" and stated that the interviewing gave the book value. Bates added that sometimes the work is "uneven" in putting information into context.
