= Fred D. Shepard =

Fred Shepard
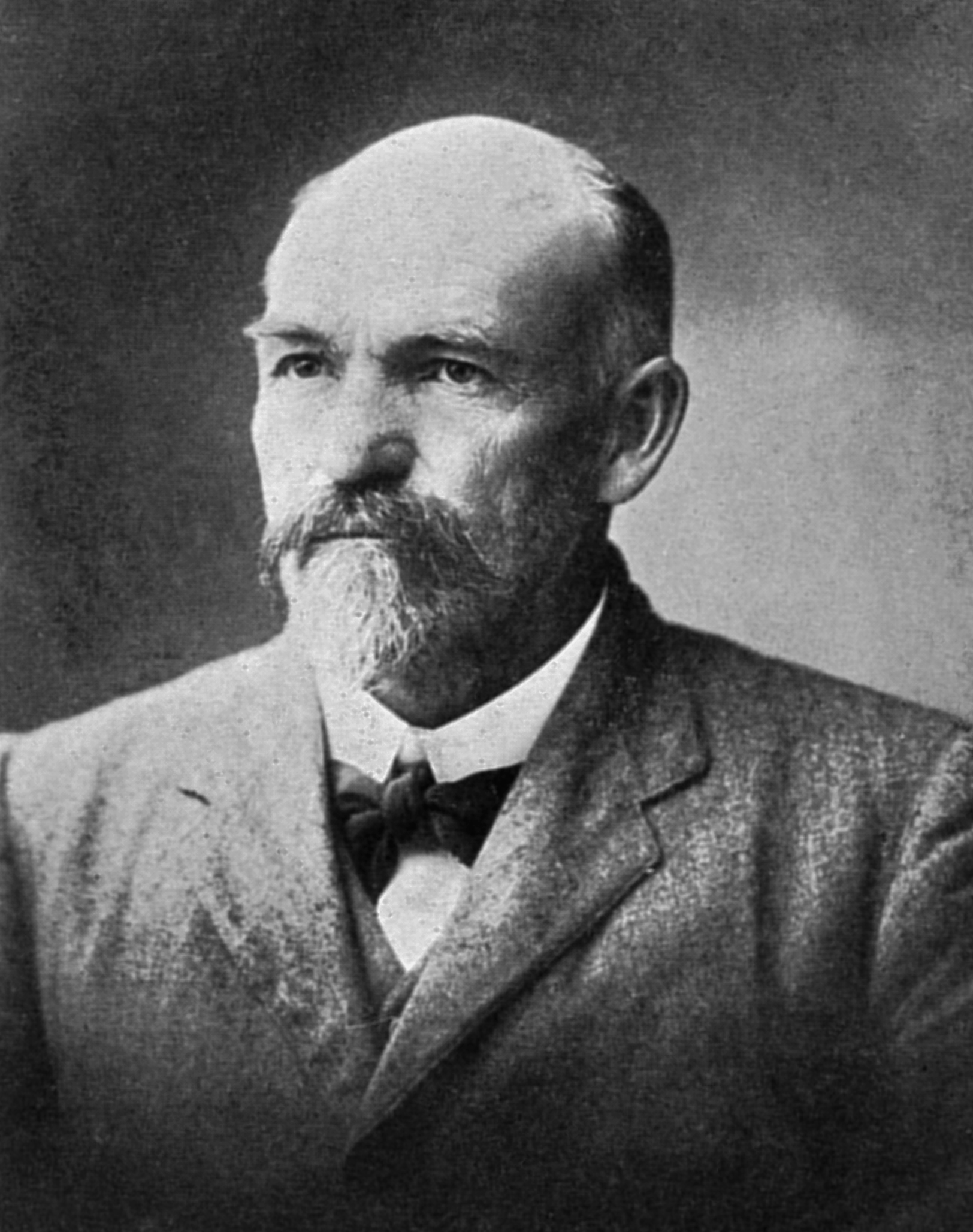
- Born: 11 September 1855; Ellenburg, New York, United States
- Died: 18 December 1915 (aged 60); Antep, Ottoman Empire
- Education: University of Michigan
- Occupation: Physician

Fred Douglas Shepard (11 September 1855 – 18 December 1915) was an American physician who witnessed the Armenian Genocide. Due to his relief efforts, Shepard is known to have saved many lives during the genocide. He was especially known for trying to dissuade Turkish politicians from deporting the Armenians.

His son, Lorrin A. Shepard, also became a physician, working in Istanbul.

== Early life ==
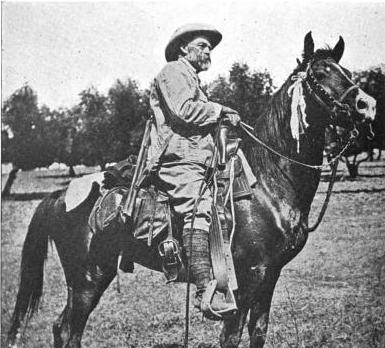
Fred Shepard traveled on horseback to Anatolian villages that did not have hospitals in order to visit patients.

Fred Douglas Shepard was born in Ellenburg, New York on 11 September 1855. He received his early education at Franklin Academy, continuing at Cornell University and then in the University of Michigan, graduating with a medical degree in 1881.

In 1882, Shepard moved to the Ottoman Empire with his physician wife, Fannie Perkins Shepard, and worked at the Azariah Smith Medical Hospital attached to Central Turkey College in Aintab. During his time at the hospital, Shepard served patients of many different races and religions. Shepard taught locals, including a number of Armenians, efficient medical skills and techniques. One of them, Dr. Habib Nazarian, became a top physician in Antep and another, Dr. A. A. Altounian, became one of the most "skillful" surgeons in Aleppo and eventually built his own hospital. Shepard sometimes conducted his medical affairs on horseback while working out of a tent and treated his patients regardless of their religion and ethnicity.

== Hamidian massacres ==
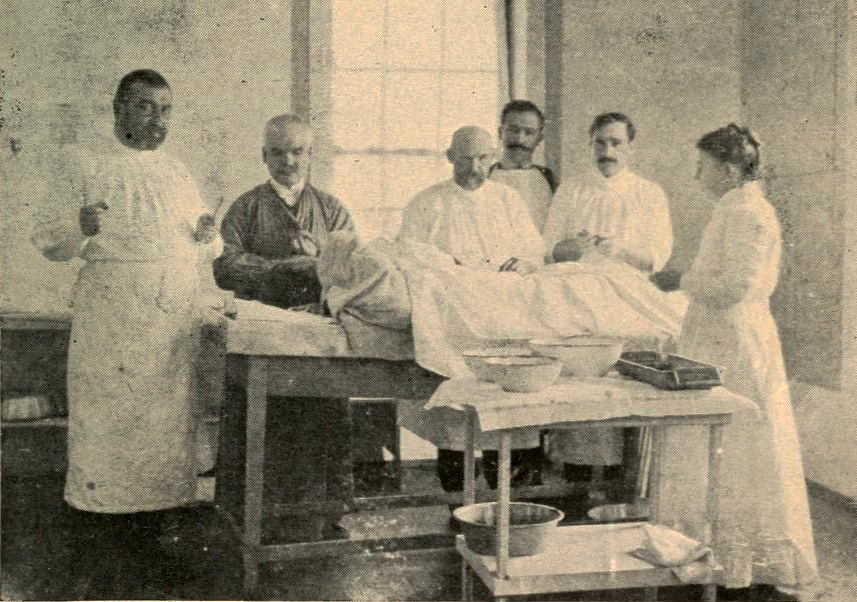
Shepard and his assistants at the operating table

In 1895, during the Hamidian massacres, word had reached Fred Shepard that the village of Zeitun was under siege. The siege, which was later known as the Zeitun Rebellion, occurred when the Armenians of the village, fearing the prospect of massacre, took up arms to defend themselves from Ottoman troops. He immediately went to Zeitun to support the relief effort. His daughter Alice Shepard Riggs recalls his arrival:

When Dr. Shepard reached Zeitoun, he found 21,000 refugees crowded together in the little town. After the long siege, when even the dead could not be carried out to be buried, the people were in a starving condition. With the crowding and filth, the "cooties" were hard at work, carrying typhus germs from one sick person to another. The people seemed to fear nothing so much as a breath of outside air; but, in spite of the fears of the patients and the protests of the old women, the doctor had them all carried out on the broad verandahs of the houses. It worked like a charm. In less than a week, instead of forty-five to fifty people dying in one day, only four or five died.

After the work in Zeitun, Shepard returned to Antep where he took part in the relief activities of the Red Cross. Antep at the time had many prominent Armenians imprisoned; businesses were closed. Shepard received many patients there and considerably helped the local population.

== Adana massacres ==
Dr. F. D. Shepard,

Dear Sir :—

Your most honored favor, dated October 29, 1910, on hand. It was a great pleasure to me to hear from one of our sincere friends. The Young Turks, who are struggling for the welfare of their beloved country, know well how to appreciate the services even of those generous persons though of foreign birth. The decoration bestowed upon you by our Ottoman government is nothing compared with your most admiring sympathy shown to the suffering humanity.

America is happy in having given birth to devoted sons like you, whose motto is to serve mankind. It was my humble duty to reach to the help of my wretched country; and I thank you for the sentiment which you will arouse toward the Ottoman Empire in America.

We are grateful to our most true and humanitarian friends, who sympathize with us at such a critical time as this. I wish to see you decorated with higher honors than this, and will feel myself always happy to hear from yon and of your good health.

Thanking you again for your prayers and favors, I remain, as ever,

Your sincere friend,

Governor General of Adana, Djemal Pasha.

— Congratulatory letter from Djemal Pasha to Fred Shepard

During the Adana massacres of 1909, Fred Shepard provided much relief to the Armenian victims. In this period, a group of Armenians had defended themselves from massacre. While the men of the group sought refuge in nearby villages, the women hid in the local church. Shepard visited the church and helped cure the sick and wounded. When the women returned to their village, they found their houses burned or destroyed. Shepard secured provisions for the destitute Armenians and received a medal for his work from the Sultan and a congratulatory letter from Djemal Pasha, the governor general of Adana. In addition to medals received from the Ottoman government, Shepard also received a medal of merit from the Red Cross.

== Armenian genocide ==
During the Armenian Genocide, Shepard was stationed in the American Hospital in Antep (today Gaziantep). He attempted numerous times to save the Armenians from deportations and subsequent massacre.

Shepard is especially known to have intervened on behalf of the Armenians to the governor general of Aleppo, Mehmet Celal Bey, by persuading him not to proceed with the deportations of Armenians. Alice Shepard Riggs describes the event as follows:

When the wave of deportation had reached, and swept over, the neighboring towns and was threatening Aintab, Dr. Shepard made a strong appeal to the Vali [Governor General] of the province of Aleppo, and this official, who was a righteous man, firmly prevented the action being carried out. Another righteous man of another town refused to send out the innocent people of his city, saying, "You may deport me and my family, if you will, but I will not carry out these orders." He was soon removed from his post. The righteous Vali of Aleppo, too, was sent away, and the fiendish work ordered against the "Christian nation" still went on.

Upon hearing from the governor general of Aleppo that the orders came from the central authorities in the capital Constantinople, Shepard went there in order to try to prevent further deportations. Though he was unsuccessful at stopping them, he did manage however to collect relief funds for the deportees. Meanwhile, he also received assurances that the Catholic and Protestant Armenians would not be deported, as written by Alice Shepard Riggs:

Having failed in his efforts to save all, and brokenhearted at the thought of this final tragedy. Dr. Shepard started for Aleppo to make one last appeal. Nothing could be accomplished there. "The orders were from higher up." So the doctor decided to take his appeal higher, and set out on the long journey to Constantinople. Five days later he wrote that the Imperial Government had graciously granted immunity from deportation to the Protestant and Catholic Armenians.

However, when he returned to Antep, he had learned that the assurances were not fulfilled and the Catholic and Protestant Armenians were deported and killed along with the Apostolic.

In a report to Henry Morgenthau, the American Ambassador to the Ottoman Empire, Shepard described the deportations of the Armenians in and around the village of Zeitun while also requesting that aid should be provided "until they get established in their new surroundings," since in a matter of months "two-thirds or three-fourths of them will die of starvation and disease."

== Death ==
Fred Shepard contracted typhus from Armenian deportees and died on 18 December 1915. Funeral processions were held at the college campus in Antep. Upon his death, an Armenian is said to have remarked, "I have not seen Jesus, but I have seen Dr. Shepard."

== Gallery ==
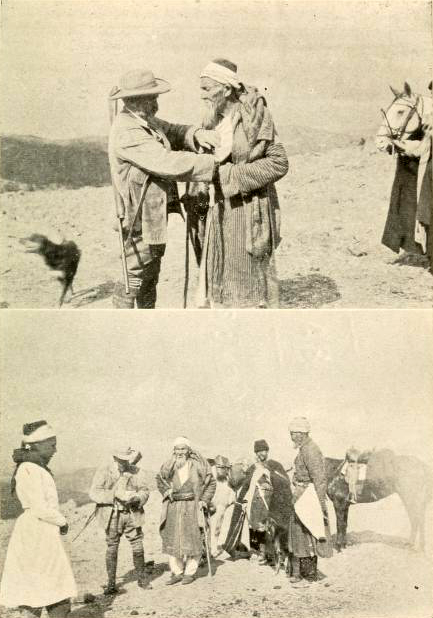
Fred Shepard doing medical work in the field

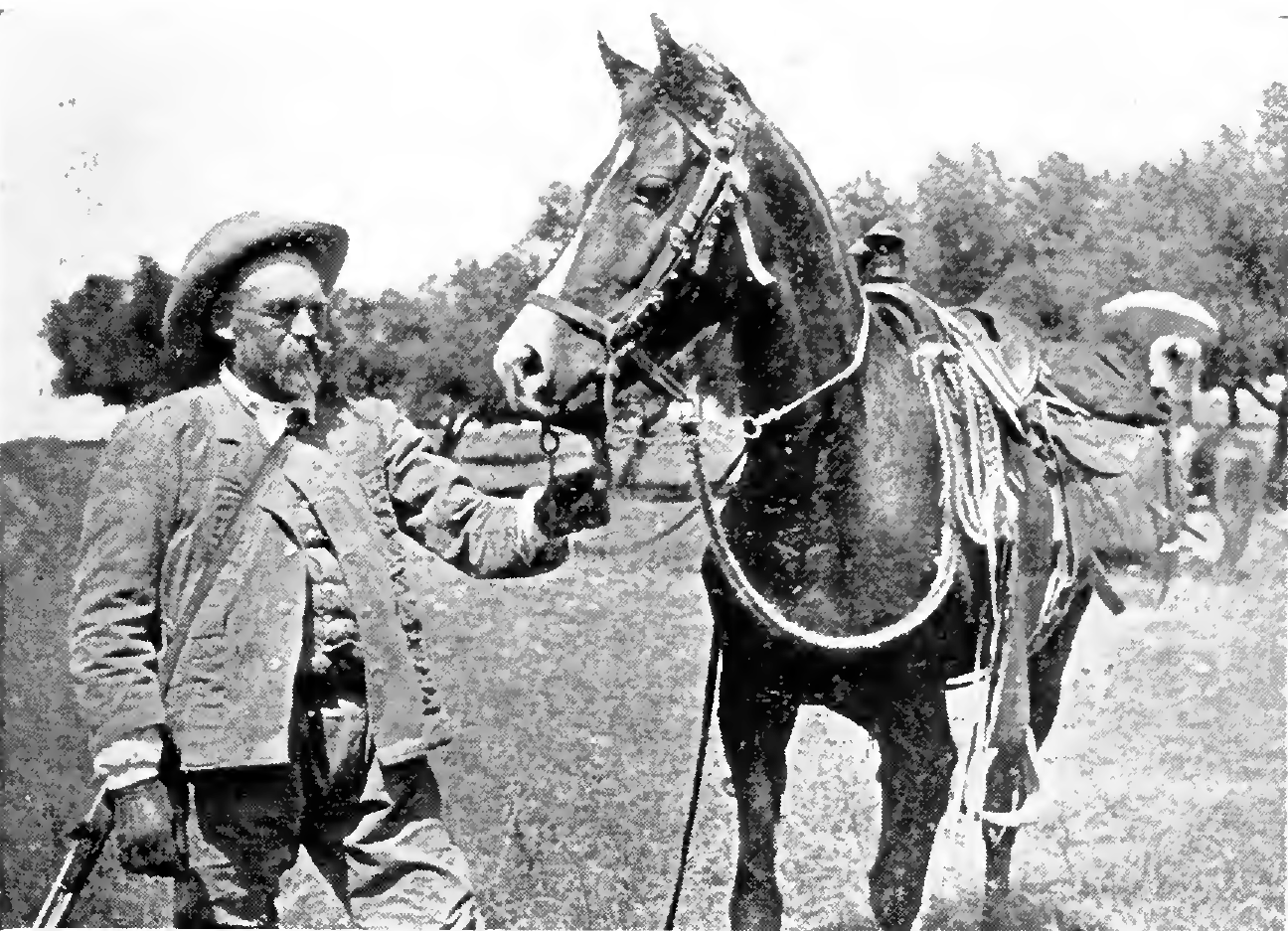
Fred Shepard with his horse

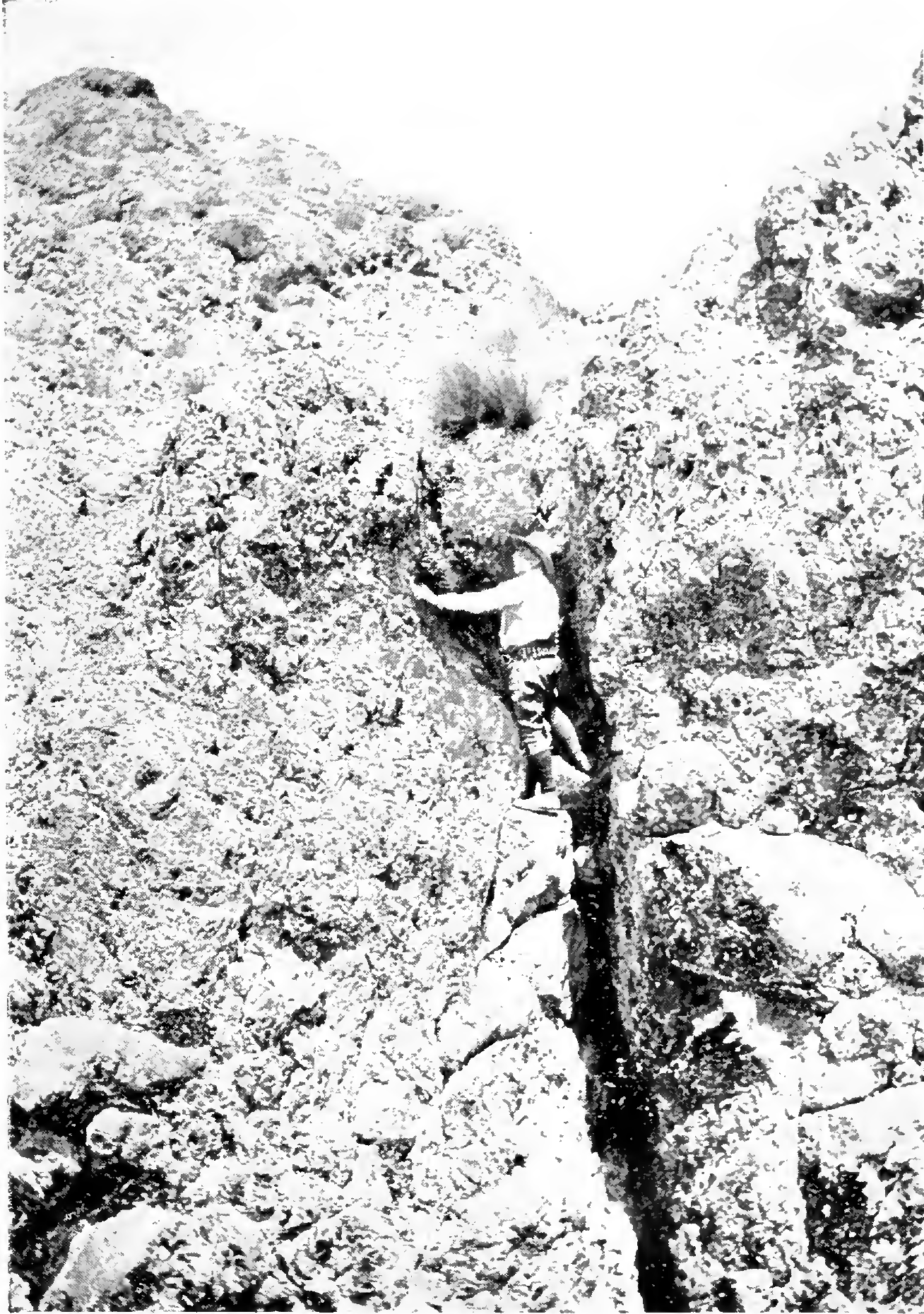
Fred Shepard climbing a mountainside

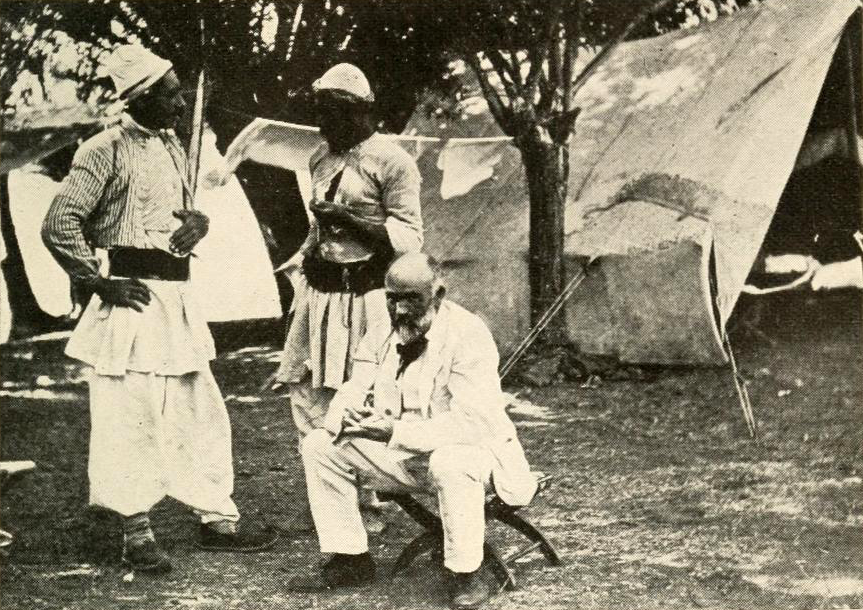
Fred Shepard at a camp

== Bibliography ==
- Franklin, James Henry (1919). Ministers of Mercy. Methodist Book Concern.
- Hovannisian, Richard G. (2004). The Armenian people from ancient to modern times (1. paperback ed.). New York, NY: St. Martin's Press. ISBN 140396422X.
- Howe, Marvine (2000). Turkey: a nation divided over Islam's revival. Boulder, Colorado: Westview Press. ISBN 0813342422.
- Kaiser, Hilmar; Eskijian, Nancy (2002). At the crossroads of Der Zor: death, survival, and humanitarian resistance in Aleppo, 1915 – 1917. Taderon Press (Gomidas Institute). ISBN 1903656125.
- Kurdoghlian, Mihran (1996). Պատմութիւն Հայոց (History of Armenia), Volume III (in Armenian). Athens, Greece: Council of National Education Publishing.
- Payaslian, Simon (2006). United States policy toward the Armenian question and the Armenian genocide. Basingstoke: Palgrave Macmillan. ISBN 1403978409.
- Riggs, Alice Shepard (1920). Constance Shepard Jolly (ed.). Shepard of Aintab. Princeton, NJ: Gomidas Inst. Books. ISBN 1903656052.
- Seaver Malone, Frederick J. (1918). Historical Sketches of Franklin County and its several towns. Albany, New York: J. B. Lyon Company, Printers.
- Woman's Board of Missions (March 1916). "An Appreciation: Dr. Fred Douglas Shepard". Life and Light for Woman. 46 (3).
