= Otis Cary =

American Japanologist

Otis Cary (October 20, 1921 – April 14, 2006) was an American Japanologist.

== Early life and education ==
Cary was born on October 20, 1921, in Otaru, Hokkaido, Japan. He was the son of American missionaries. He moved to the United States after elementary school. He continued his education at Deerfield Academy in Massachusetts, and at Amherst College.

== Career ==
In 1941, Cary attended the United States Navy Japanese Language School and became an interpreter for Japanese prisoners of war during World War II. After the war, Cary returned to the United States and married his wife Alice in 1944. He also earned a master's degree from Yale University. In 1947 Cary moved to Kyoto and joined the faculty of Doshisha University. He taught American studies. Cary and Alice lived in Doshisha's Amherst House dormitory.

In 1987, Cary was awarded the Order of the Sacred Treasure, Third Class. Before retiring in 1996, he co-founded Doshisha's Center for American Studies. After retiring, he moved to Oakland, California, where he died of pneumonia on April 14, 2006.

== Bibliography ==
- War-wasted Asia : letters, 1945-46. Kodansha, USA. 1975.
