= Methylmercuric dicyanamide =

Names
- IUPAC name [(E)-[amino-(cyanoamino)methylidene]amino]-methylmercury
- Other names Agrosol; Morsodren; Pandrinox; panogen 15

Identifiers
CAS Number	502-39-6
3D model (JSmol)	Interactive image
ChemSpider	10468530
ECHA InfoCard	100.007.214
PubChem CID	16682942
UNII	FO98N7765W
CompTox Dashboard (EPA)	DTXSID8040309
- InChI: InChI=1S/C2H3N4.CH3.Hg/c3-1-6-2(4)5;;/h(H3-,4,5,6);1H3;/q-1;;+1 Key: JVJUWCMBRUMDDQ-UHFFFAOYSA-N; InChI=1/C2H3N4.CH3.Hg/c3-1-6-2(4)5;;/h(H3-,4,5,6);1H3;/q-1;;+1/rC3H6HgN4/c1-4-8-3(6)7-2-5/h1H3,(H3,6,7,8) Key: JVJUWCMBRUMDDQ-VQCQDXMOAD
- SMILES: C[Hg]N=C(N)NC#N

Properties
Chemical formula	C_{3}H_{6}HgN_{4}
Molar mass	298.70 g/mol
- Except where otherwise noted, data are given for materials in their standard state (at 25 °C [77 °F], 100 kPa). Infobox references

Methylmercuric dicyanamide is a chemical compound used as a fungicide for crops such as cereals, cotton, flax, sorghum, and sugar beets. As of 1998, the U.S. Environmental Protection Agency listed it as an unregistered pesticide in the United States. Although named as a dicyanamide, the major organic structure is a 2-cyanoguanidino group.
