= Mary Kilbourne Matossian =

American historian

- Born: Mary Allerton Kilbourne; July 9, 1930; Los Angeles, California
- Died: July 9, 2023 (age 93); Portola Valley, California
- Occupation(s): Historian, college professor
- Notable work: The Impact of Soviet Policies in Armenia (1962); Poisons of the Past (1989)
- Relatives: Fanny Andrews Shepard (great-aunt)

Mary Allerton Kilbourne Matossian (July 9, 1930 – July 9, 2023) was an American historian who was perhaps best known in the fields of Soviet and Armenian studies for her pioneering research on the history of Soviet Armenia. In her later career, she was also known for her interest in interdisciplinary approaches, as exemplified in her book Poisons of the Past: Molds, Epidemics, and History (1989).

== Early life and education ==
Kilbourne was born in Los Angeles, California, the daughter of Norman J. Kilbourne and Katharine Rebecca Hillix Kilbourne. Her father was a physician, and her mother was active in the YWCA. Her first and middle name were chosen in memory of Mary Allerton, a Mayflower ancestor. Medical missionary and botanist Fanny Andrews Shepard was her great-aunt. She graduated from Stanford University in 1951. She earned a master's degree in Near East history from the American University of Beirut, and completed doctoral studies in history at Stanford University in 1955.

== Career ==
Matossian was an early member of the National Association for Armenian Studies and Research (NAASR), joining in 1955, soon after its founding. In 1962, she published the book The Impact of Soviet Policies in Armenia, a groundbreaking study that influenced scholars such as Ronald Grigor Suny. The work "stood virtually alone for two decades as the main Anglophone source on Soviet social reforms in Armenian life." Pietro Shakarian credits Matossian with being the first historian to identify the significance of Anastas Mikoyan's role in initiating the Khrushchev Thaw in Soviet Armenia. The chapters of Matossian's work on Armenian women "remain the historiographical point of reference for contemporary scholars."

Matossian was a professor in the history department at the University of Maryland, College Park, for 31 years. She was president of the UM Tenured Faculty Women's Association, and outspoken on issues affecting women professors. In the 1980s and 1990s, she became known for her study on the role of food contamination in historical events such as the Salem witchcraft panic (following on the earlier work of Linnda R. Caporael) and the Great Fear of 1789. These later works drew from medical history, environmental history, women's history, and religious history, and gained significant attention in the popular press.

== Publications ==
Matossian's interdisciplinary interests are reflected in the wide range of academic journals where her work was published, including Slavic Review, Medical History, Quaker History, Journal of Social History, Middle East Journal, Economic Development and Cultural Change, Perspectives in Biology and Medicine, and Free Inquiry.

- "Two Marxist Approaches to Nationalism" (1957)
- "Ideologies of Delayed Industrialization: Some Tensions and Ambiguities" (1958)
- The Impact of Soviet Policies in Armenia (1962)
- "In the Beginning, God was a Woman" (1973)
- "Birds, Bees, and Barley: Pagan Origins of Armenian Spring Rituals" (1979)
- "The Transformation of Armenian Life under Stalin" (1980)
- "Mold Poisoning: An Unrecognized English Health Problem, 1550-1800" (1981)
- Armenian Village Life Before 1914 (1982, with Susie Hoogasian Villa)
- "Ergot and the Salem Witchcraft Affair" (1982)
- "Did mycotoxins play a role in bubonic plague epidemics?" (1986)
- "Climate, Crops, and Natural Increase in Rural Russia, 1861-1913" (1986)
- Poisons of the Past: Molds, Epidemics, and History (1989)
- "Fertility decline in Europe, 1875-1913. Was zinc deficiency the cause?" (1991)
- Shaping World History: Breakthroughs in Ecology, Technology, Science, and Politics (1997)
- "Why the Quakers quaked: the influence of climatic change on Quaker health, 1647-1659" (2007)
- "Visions and the Origins of Christianity" (2009)
- Plants, Stars, and the Origins of Religion: With a Decipherment of the Phaistos Disk (2014)

== Personal life ==
Kilbourne married Garabed Setrak "Garo" Matossian, an Armenian physician; they met during her graduate work in Beirut. They had four children. They later divorced. She died in 2023, on her 93rd birthday, in Portola Valley, California.
