= Fanny Andrews Shepard =

American physician, missionary, botanical collector and business person (1856 – 1920)

Frances "Fanny" Andrews Shepard
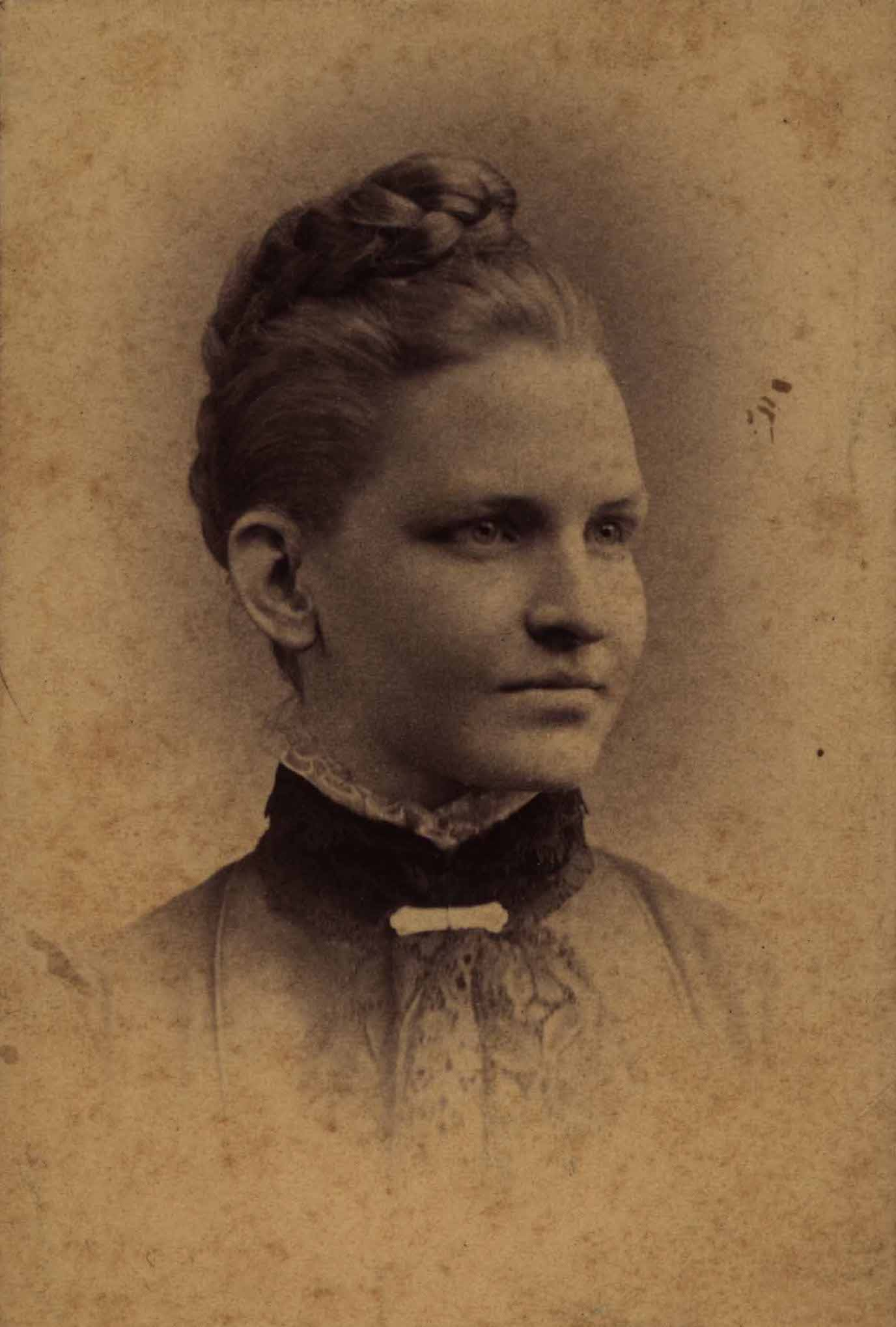
- Born: 14 July 1856; Maui, United States
- Died: 4 June 1920 (aged 63); East Orange, United States
- Education: University of Michigan
- Occupations: Physician, Missionary, Botanical collector

Frances Perkins Andrews Shepard (14 July 1856 – 4 June 1920) was an American physician who worked as a missionary and university lecturer in Turkey. As a woman she was not permitted to work as a physician, but could work as a nurse and midwife, and lecture in medical botany at the Medical Department of the Central Turkey College. She also assisted widows and orphans to support themselves by enabling them to sell goods they crafted. She made a scientifically significant botanical collection in and around the area where she lived, sending these specimens to George Edward Post, thus assisting with his publication The Flora of Syria, Palestine and Sinai. Her collection is held in the Herbarium of the American University of Beirut, and her type specimens are held at Geneva Botanical Garden.

== Early life ==
Shepard was born in Maui in Hawaii on 14 July 1855 to the Andrews family, missionaries who lived in Hawaii. She was educated at Mount Holyoke College, graduating with a Bachelor of Arts degree in 1879. She then studied at the University of Michigan, undertaking medical training and graduating with a medical degree in 1882. She married fellow physician Fred D. Shepard on 15 July 1882 at Ann Arbor.

== Medical work ==
In 1882, Shepard moved to the Ottoman Empire with her husband, and supported his work at the Azariah Smith Medical Hospital attached to Central Turkey College in Aintab. Although as a woman she was not permitted to work as a physician, she could work as a nurse and midwife at the Aintab American Hospital. Later she lectured in medical botany at the Medical Department of the Central Turkey College.

== Botanising ==
Shepard was the first woman to make a collection of herbarium specimens in Turkey. She sent them to George Edward Post, thus assisting with his publication The Flora of Syria, Palestine and Sinai. The specimens she collected now form part of the herbarium of the American University of Beirut, with the type specimens she collecting being held at the Geneva Botanical Garden. Post named the species Medicago shepardii in her honour.

== Business ==
She continued to live and work in Aintab between the years 1882 and 1919. While living there she established a firm called Industries for Women and Girls with Corinna Shattuck, where women could work producing needlework for export. Shepard then worked with her sister Lucy C. Andrews to establish a market for the lace and needlework. Her sister, after a visit to Turkey, returned to the United States with samples of the lace and needlework, and supplied American businesses with these products. The money earned through this business helped support the women producing the products, to fund a library building at the Central Turkey College, and assisted in funding a new wing for the hospital at Aintab.

== Death ==
Shepard died on 4 June 1920 at Orange, New Jersey.
