= Linnda R. Caporael =

Professor

Linnda Caporael is a professor at the Science and Technology Studies Department at Rensselaer Polytechnic Institute.

== Educational background ==
Linnda R. Caporael is a professor at Rensselaer Polytechnic Institute in the department of Technical Studies and Science. She received her PhD in Psychology at the University of California, Santa Barbara, and she also studied human ethology at the Institute of Child Development at the University of London. She is a Fulbright-Hayes Scholar and a visiting scientist in the Dept. of Invertebrate Paleontology and in the Dept. of Anthropology at the American Museum of Natural History. She researches culture from a biological perspective and biology from a cultural perspective.

== Hypothesis of ergotism and the Salem witch trials ==
In the April 2, 1976, weekly issue of Science magazine, Caporael debuted a hypothesis that the accusations of witchcraft in Salem, Massachusetts, in 1692 could have been caused by ergotism. A fungus that grows on grains of rye, ergot contains a toxin which resembles LSD, and which can remain toxic in bread baked with flour tainted by it. Her evidence to support this theory includes historic weather reports and other growing conditions that foster the growth of this fungus, and the reported symptoms of several accusers, including hallucinations and crawling sensations in skin, which appear to match symptoms of ergot poisoning. Within days of the article's publication, historian Stephen Nissenbaum, co-author of Salem Possessed, publicly disputed the notion, saying that it "appears unlikely to me that this would not happen in any other year, in any other household and in any other village." In the December 24, 1976, issue of Science, psychologists Nicholas P. Spanos and Jack Gottlieb published a complete review of all the evidence, historical and medical, and concluded that the data did not support Caporael's hypothesis. In 1982, historian Mary Matossian defended Caporael by restating that the weather conditions were prime for growing ergot and that the symptoms of ergot matched the symptoms of the victims. A year later, Nicholas Spanos challenged Matossian's defense of Caporael, defending his original rebuttal, stating that her argument was "irrelevant to the ergot hypothesis, incorrect, and presented in a highly misleading manner."

== Published works ==
- Caporael, L. R. (1976). Ergotism: The Satan loosed in Salem? Science, 192, 21-26.
- Caporael, L. R. & Atherton, P. R. (1985). A Subjective Judgment Study of Polygon Based Curved Surface Imagery. In L. Borman and & B. Curtis (Eds.), Proceedings of the ACM CHI 85 Human Factors in Computing Systems Conference. April 14–18, 1985, San Francisco, California. p. 27-34.
- Caporael, L. R. (1986). Anthropomorphism and mechanomorphism: Two faces of the human machine. Computers in Human Behavior, 2, 215-234.
- Caporael, L. R. (1987). Homo sapiens, Homo faber, Homo socians: Technology and the social animal. In W. Callebaut & R. Pinxten (Eds.), Evolutionary epistemology: A multiparadigm program (pp. 233–244). Dordrecht: Reidel.
- Caporael, L. R. (1987). A window on war: Women and militarism in Ancient Greece. Paper presented at the American Anthropological Association, Chicago.
- Caporael, L. R., Dawes, R. M., Orbell, J. M., & van de Kragt, A. J. C. (1989). Selfishness examined: Cooperation in the absence of egoistic incentives. Behavioral and Brain Sciences, 12, 683-739.
- Caporael, L. R. (1997). Vehicles of knowledge: Artifacts and social groups. Evolution and Cognition, 3, 39-43.
- Caporael, L. R. (2001). Evolutionary psychology: Toward a unifying theory and a hybrid science. Annual Review of Psychology, 52, 607-628.
- Caporael, L. R. (2003). Repeated assembly. In S. Schur & F. Rauscher (Eds.), Alternative approaches to evolutionary psychology (pp. 71–90): Kluwer.
- Caporael, L. R. (2007). Evolutionary theory for social and cultural psychology. In E. T. Higgins & A. Kruglanski (Eds.), Social psychology: Handbook of basic principles (pp. 3–18). New York: Guildford Press.
