= Central Turkey College =

Former college in Gaziantep, Turkey

There was also a Central Turkey College in Maraş.

Central Turkey College (sometimes called Aintab College) was a Christian high school founded between 1874 and 1876 by the American Mission Board in Aintab, Ottoman Empire (now Gaziantep, Turkey). It was on a site west of the city, and also had a branch for girls in town. It was burned down in 1891, but was rebuilt.

Its students were largely Armenian Protestants, but non-Armenians and non-Protestants also attended. One of its most famous graduates, for example, was Ashur Yousif, a member of the Syriac Orthodox Church and a future instructor at Euphrates College in Harput.

As a result of the massacres of the Armenians during the 1915 Armenian genocide, the college was transferred to the Syrian city of Aleppo, through the efforts of its director John E. Merrill (1898–1937), where it became known as Aleppo College or the Aleppo American College.

== See also ==
- List of missionary schools in Turkey
- List of high schools in Turkey
