= Carrie Derick =

Canadian botanist and geneticist

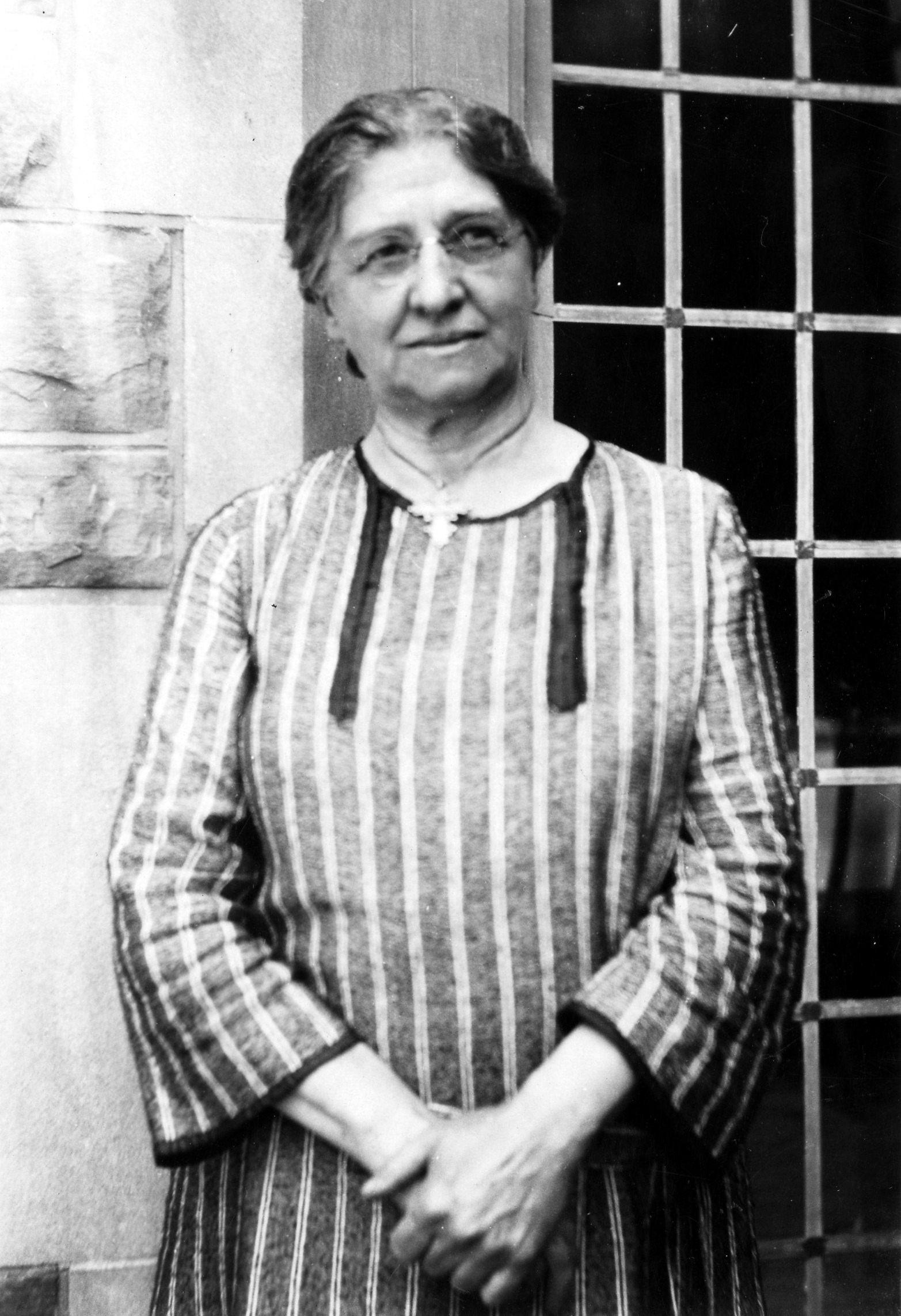
- Derick in Toronto at a meeting of the British Association for the Advancement of Science, August 1924
- Born: January 14, 1862; Clarenceville, Canada East
- Died: November 10, 1941 (aged 79); Montreal, Quebec, Canada
- Education: Clarenceville Academy; McGill University (B.A. 1890); University of Bonn (completed work for Ph.D., 1901); Harvard University; the Royal College of Science; Marine Biological Laboratory
- Known for: Canada's first woman professor; Founding McGill University's genetics department
- Awards: J.C. Weston prize
- Scientific career
- Fields: Botany, genetics
- Workplaces: Clarenceville Academy, McGill University
- Notable students: Faith Fyles

Carrie Matilda Derick (January 14, 1862 – November 10, 1941) was a Canadian botanist and geneticist, the first woman professor in a Canadian university, and the founder of McGill University's genetics department.

== Early life and education ==
Born in the Eastern Townships in Clarenceville, Canada East (now Quebec) in 1862, Derick was educated at the Clarenceville Academy in Clarenceville, QC. She began teaching by the age of fifteen. Derick later received teacher training at the McGill Normal School, graduating in 1881 as a Prince of Wales Gold Medal winner. She then went on to become a school teacher in Clarenceville and Montreal, and later serving as a principal (at the age of nineteen) of the Clarenceville Academy.

In 1889, Derick pursued a B.A. from McGill University, and graduated in 1890, at the top of her class in natural science with first-class honours, the highest GPA (94%) that year, and received the Logan Gold Medal. Her graduating class included two other notable Canadian women: Elizabeth Binmore and Maude Abbott. She began teaching at the Trafalgar Institute for Girls in 1890, while also working part-time as McGill's first woman botany demonstrator.

In 1891, Derick began her master's program at McGill under David Penhallow and received her M.A. in botany within four years (1896), while holding two simultaneous jobs. She then attended the University of Bonn, Germany, in 1901 and completed the research required for a Ph.D. but was not awarded an official doctorate since the University of Bonn did not give women Ph.D. degrees at the time.

Derick also studied at Harvard University for three summers, the Royal College of Science, London in 1898, and the Marine Biological Laboratory in Woods Hole, Massachusetts for seven summers.

== Career ==
=== Achieving university professorship ===
Following her PhD research, Derick then returned to McGill University. Given her previous seven years of teaching, researching, administration work and publishing (without pay) at McGill University, Derick wrote directly to Principal Peterson and was promoted to the position of assistant professor at one-third the salary of her male counterparts in 1905.

In 1909, when Penhallow (Derick's former Master's supervisor, then chair for McGill University's Botany Department) fell ill, Derick assumed his role as chair. Penhallow died in 1910. Following Penhallow's death, Derick continued to run the department for three years. In 1912, McGill University began a search for a new department chair and did not recruit Derick, despite her previous experience or the strong support she received.

Instead, Derick was officially appointed as professor of morphological botany by McGill University in 1912. This made Derick the first woman both at McGill University and in Canada to achieve university professorship. However, morphological botany was not Derick's research expertise, and this new position did not come with a pay rise, or a seat on the faculty. Derick was told by the McGill University president that this was a 'courtesy title' and she was not actually a professor. Furthermore, the new botany department chair assigned Derick work suitable for a demonstrator, not a professor.

Derick continued to persevere in her role, and returned to teaching and research after a new demonstrator was hired. She later petitioned to have her title changed to professor of comparative morphology and genetics to be more representative of her expertise and research interests.

Derick founded McGill University's genetics department. She created the Evolution and Genetics course (the first of its kind in Canada) and published a number of academic publications on botany. She was one of the few women to be listed in the American Men of Science (1910).

Due to poor health, Derick retired in 1929. McGill University awarded her the honorary title of "professor emerita," making her the first woman professor emeritus in Canada.

=== Service and advocacy ===
Derick was a leader in early feminism: fighting for women's right to education, the vote, and work. Derick also co-founded and was a lifelong member of the National Council of Women of Canada. Her co-founder was Maude Abbott: McGill's pioneer cardiologist and curator of the Medical Museum.

Derick was a member of the Mu Iota Society, a group whose name was later changed to The Alumnae Society. She was a fellow of the American Association for the Advancement of Science, vice president of the Natural History Society of Montreal, and a member of the Botanical Society of America, the American Genetics Association, the Montreal Philosophical Club, the Canadian Public Health Association, the Executive Committee of the National Council of Education, and the first woman on the Protestant Committee of Public Instruction, Quebec, from 1920 to 1937.

Derick was also president of the Montreal Suffrage Association from 1913 to 1919. She publicly supported birth control in Canada (which was then illegal from 1891 to 1969). In 1915, Derrick confronted then Quebec premier Sir Lomer Gouin regarding his views on the topic of birth control. Derick also supported other social causes, including the need for mandatory school attendance for children, and care for 'abnormal' children.

In 1914, Derick supported Annie Langstaff, the first woman law graduate from McGill University, in her unsuccessful bid to join Quebec's bar. One of Derick's students, Faith Fyles, went on to become assistant botanist on the Central Experimental Farm in Ottawa.

== Death ==
Derick died on November 10, 1941, in Montreal, Quebec.

== Posthumous recognition ==
A street (Rue Carrie-Derick) is named after her in Montreal's Southwest borough. An award has been created in her honour at McGill University, titled the Carrie M. Derick Award for Graduate Supervision and Teaching.

Derick was designated as a National Historic Person in 2007, and as of 2023, her designation is identified for review. On her 155th birthday in 2017, she was recognized through a Google Doodle.

== Awards ==
- The J.C. Weston prize

== See also ==
- Timeline of women in science
