= Elizabeth Binmore =

Canadian educationist

Elizabeth Binmore (1860 – 24 August 1917) was an educator from Montreal, known for her career and her important personal firsts in education.

Binmore received her first higher education at the McGill Normal School from 1875 to 1878, this being the only public institution to offer instruction to English-speaking women of Montreal. She obtained three teaching diplomas during her time there and began a lifelong teaching career.

Education opportunities expanded for her in 1884 when McGill College opened their arts faculty to women. She was part of their third class of women and graduated with a Bachelor of Arts in 1890. Other graduates in that class included Maude Abbott and Carrie Matilda Derick. She earned her Master of Arts from McGill in 1894; sharing the honour of being the first woman to do so with one other lady. She received further postgraduate education from Harvard University. This work was not recognized with a further degree as Harvard was not awarding degrees to women at that time.

Binmore is credited with being an implementer in Montreal of educational sloyd, which was a leading edge manual educational innovation in the latter half of the nineteenth century. She held a number of important posts including the president of the Teachers’ Association of Montreal. She was the first woman to hold this post. She served on the executive of the Provincial Association of Protestant Teachers for a time. She was a longtime member of the Alumnae Society of McGill University and held important positions there including president and treasurer.
