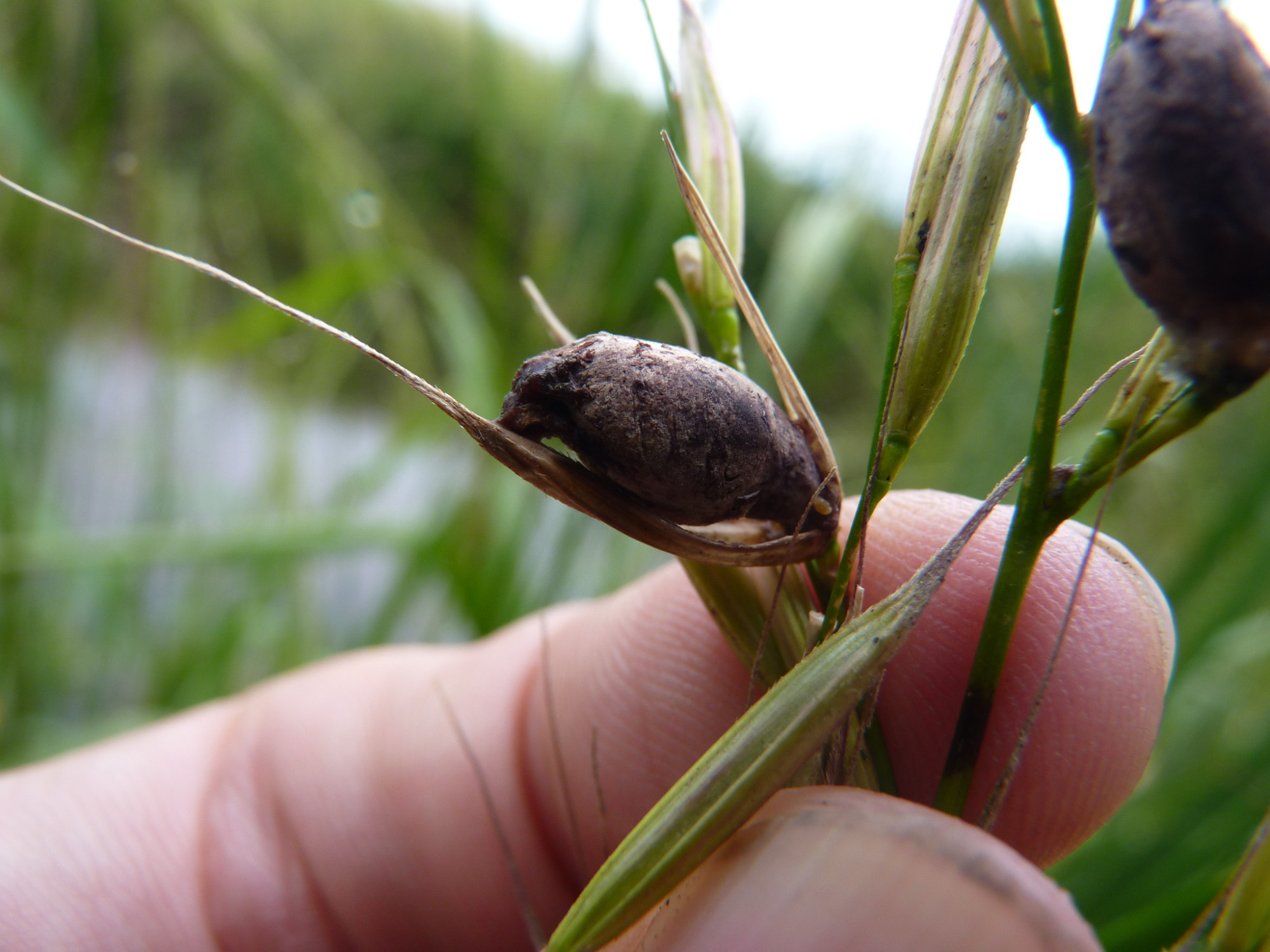
- Claviceps zizaniae growing on wildrice plants in a marsh in Nova Scotia.

Scientific classification
- Kingdom: Fungi
- Division: Ascomycota
- Class: Sordariomycetes
- Order: Hypocreales
- Family: Clavicipitaceae
- Genus: Claviceps
- Species: C. zizaniae

Binomial name
- Claviceps zizaniae (Fyles) ex Redhead, M.E.Corlett & M.N.L.Lefebvre (2009)

Synonyms
- Spermoedia zizaniae Fyles (1920); Claviceps zizaniae (Fyles) Pantidou (1959)

= Claviceps zizaniae =

Species of fungus

Claviceps zizaniae is a plant pathogen that causes ergot in the wild rice species Zizania aquatica and Z. palustris. Originally described in 1920 as Spermoedia zizaniae by Faith Fyles, it was transferred to Claviceps in 1959 by Maria E. Pantidou. The new combination, however, was not published validly as Pantidou "failed to provide a full and direct reference to the place of publication". The binomial was published validly by Scott Redhead and colleagues in 2009.
