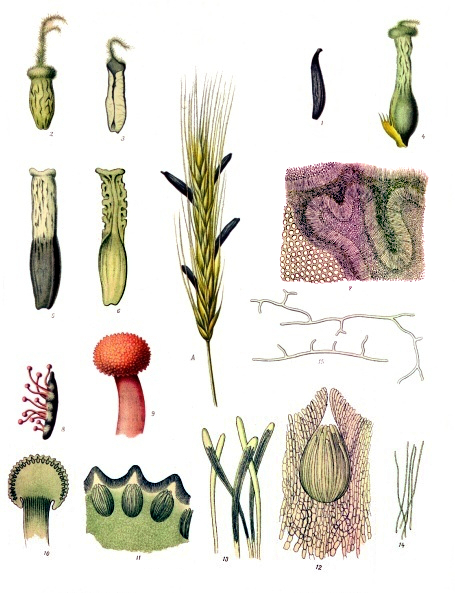
- Claviceps purpurea

Scientific classification
- Kingdom: Fungi
- Division: Ascomycota
- Class: Sordariomycetes
- Order: Hypocreales
- Family: Clavicipitaceae
- Genus: Claviceps; Tul., 1853

Species
- About 50, including: Claviceps africana Claviceps fusiformis Claviceps paspali Claviceps purpurea Claviceps pusilla Claviceps sorghi Claviceps zizaniae Claviceps lutea Oryza sativa

Synonyms
- List: Balansiella Henn. (1904); Ergotaetia E.J. Quekett (1841); Kentrosporium Wallr. (1844) [1842-44]; Mothesia Oddo & Tonolo (1967); Spermoedia Fr. (1822); Sphacelia Lév. (1827); Ustilaginula Clem. (1909); Ustilagopsis Speg. (1880)

= Ergot =

Fungi of the genus Claviceps

Ergot (/ˈɜːrɡət/), or ergot fungi, is a group of fungi of the genus Claviceps.

The most prominent member of this group is Claviceps purpurea (rye ergot fungus). This fungus grows on rye and related plants, and produces alkaloids that can cause ergotism in humans and other mammals who consume grains contaminated with its fruiting structure (called ergot sclerotium).

Claviceps includes about 50 known species, mostly in the tropical regions. Economically significant species include C. purpurea (parasitic on grasses and cereals), C. fusiformis (on pearl millet, buffel grass), C. paspali (on dallis grass), C. africana (on sorghum) and C. lutea (on paspalum). C. purpurea most commonly affects outcrossing species such as rye (its most common host), as well as triticale, wheat and barley. It affects oats only rarely.

C. purpurea has at least three races, or varieties, which differ in their host specificity:

- G1 – land grasses of open meadows and fields;
- G2 – grasses from moist, forest and mountain habitats;
- G3 (C. purpurea var. spartinae) – salt marsh grasses (Spartina, Distichlis).

== Life cycle ==
An ergot kernel, called a sclerotium, develops when a spore of fungal species of the genus Claviceps infects a floret of flowering grass or cereal. The infection process mimics a pollen grain growing into an ovary during fertilization. Infection requires that the fungal spore have access to the stigma; consequently, plants infected by Claviceps are mainly outcrossing species with open flowers, such as rye (Secale cereale) and ryegrasses (genus Lolium). The proliferating fungal mycelium then destroys the plant ovary and connects with the vascular bundle originally intended for seed nutrition. The first stage of ergot infection manifests itself as a white soft tissue (known as sphacelia) producing sugary honeydew, which often drops out of the infected grass florets. This honeydew contains millions of asexual spores (conidia), which insects disperse to other florets. Later, the sphacelia convert into a hard dry sclerotium inside the husk of the floret. At this stage, alkaloids and lipids accumulate in the sclerotium.

Claviceps species from tropic and subtropic regions produce macro- and microconidia in their honeydew. Macroconidia differ in shape and size between the species, whereas microconidia are rather uniform, oval to globose (5×3 μm). Macroconidia are able to produce secondary conidia. A germ tube emerges from a macroconidium through the surface of a honeydew drop and a secondary conidium of an oval to pearlike shape is formed, to which the contents of the original macroconidium migrates. Secondary conidia form a white, frost-like surface on honeydew drops and spread via the wind. No such process occurs in Claviceps purpurea, Claviceps grohii, Claviceps nigricans and Claviceps zizaniae, all from northern temperate regions.

When a mature sclerotium drops to the ground, the fungus remains dormant until proper conditions (such as the onset of spring or a rain period) trigger its fruiting phase. It germinates, forming one or several fruiting bodies with heads and stipes, variously coloured (resembling a tiny mushroom). In the head, threadlike sexual spores form, which are ejected simultaneously when suitable grass hosts are flowering.

Ergot infection causes a reduction in the yield and quality of grain and hay, and if livestock eat infected grain or hay it may cause a disease called ergotism. Black and protruding sclerotia of C. purpurea are well known. However, many tropical ergots have brown or greyish sclerotia, mimicking the shape of the host seed. For this reason, the infection is often overlooked.

Insects, including flies and moths, carry conidia of Claviceps species, but it is unknown whether insects play a role in spreading the fungus from infected to healthy plants.

== Evolution ==
Regarding the evolution of plant parasitism in the Clavicipitaceae, an amber fossil discovered in 2020 preserves a grass spikelet and an ergot-like parasitic fungus. The fossil shows that the original hosts of the Clavicipitaceae could have been grasses. The discovery also establishes a minimum time for the conceivable presence of psychotropic compounds in fungi. Several evolutionary processes have acted to diversify the array of ergot alkaloids produced by fungi; these differences in enzyme activities are evident at the levels of substrate specificity (LpsA), product specification (EasA, CloA) or both (EasG and possibly CloA). The "old yellow enzyme", EasA, presents an outstanding example. This enzyme catalyzes reduction of the C8=C9 double-bond in chanoclavine I, but EasA isoforms differ in whether they subsequently catalyze reoxidation of C8–C9 after rotation. This difference distinguishes most Clavicipitaceae from Trichocomaceae, but in Clavicipitaceae it is also the key difference dividing the branch of classical ergot alkaloids from dihydroergot alkaloids, the latter often being preferred for pharmaceuticals due to their relatively few side effects.

== Effects on humans, other mammals and LSD ==
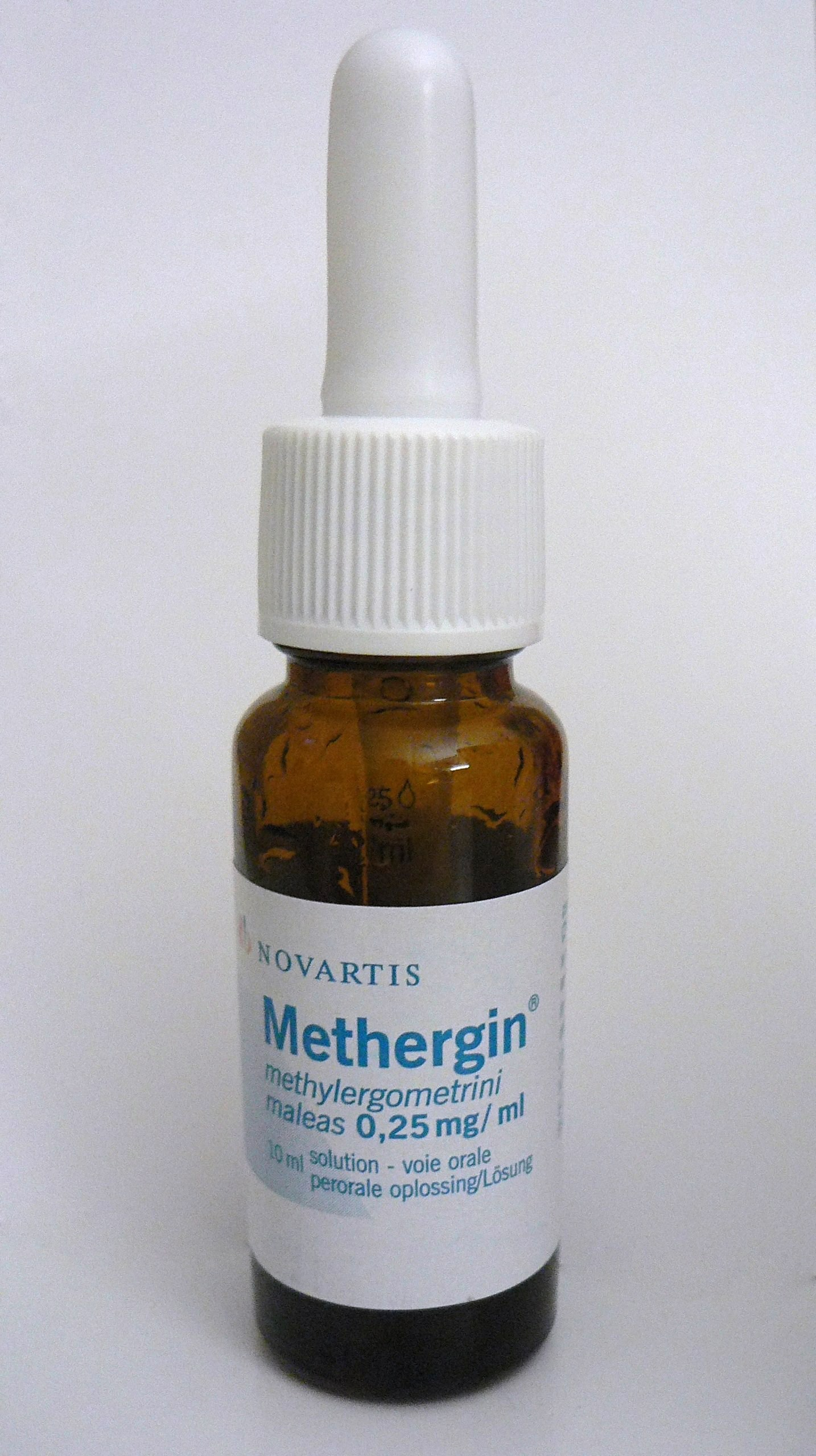
Ergot-derived drug to stop postpartum bleeding

The ergot sclerotium contains high concentrations (up to 2% of dry mass) of the alkaloid ergotamine, a complex molecule consisting of a tripeptide-derived cyclol-lactam ring connected via amide linkage to a lysergic acid (ergoline) moiety, and other alkaloids of the ergoline group that are biosynthesized by the fungus. Ergot alkaloids have a wide range of biological activities, including effects on circulation and neurotransmission.

Ergot alkaloids are classified as:

1. derivatives of 6,8-dimethylergoline and
2. lysergic acid derivatives.

Ergotism is the name for sometimes severe pathological syndromes affecting humans or other animals that have ingested plant material containing ergot alkaloid, such as ergot-contaminated grains.

The Hospital Brothers of St. Anthony, an order of monks established in 1095, specialized in treating ergotism victims with balms containing tranquilizing and circulation-stimulating plant extracts. A common name for ergotism is "St. Anthony's fire", in reference to this order of monks and the severe burning sensations in the limbs which was one of the symptoms.

There are two types of ergotism. The first is characterized by muscle spasms, fever and hallucinations and the victims may appear dazed, be unable to speak, become manic, or have other forms of paralysis or tremors, and suffer from hallucinations and other distorted perceptions. This is caused by serotonergic stimulation of the central nervous system by some of the alkaloids.

The second type of ergotism is marked by violent burning, absent peripheral pulses and shooting pain of the poorly vascularized distal organs, such as the fingers and toes, and are caused by effects of ergot alkaloids on the vascular system due to vasoconstriction, sometimes leading to gangrene and loss of limbs due to severely restricted blood circulation.

The psychoactive properties of the ergot alkaloids may also cause hallucinations and attendant irrational behaviour, convulsions, and even death. Other symptoms include strong uterine contractions, nausea, seizures, high fever, vomiting, loss of muscle strength and unconsciousness.

Since the Middle Ages, controlled doses of ergot were used to induce abortions and to stop maternal bleeding after childbirth.

Toxicity of ergot in mammalian livestock are attributable to antagonism or agonism of neurotransmitters, including dopamine, serotonin and norepinephrine. Reduced prolactin due to ergot alkaloid activity on dopamine receptors in the pituitary is also common in livestock. Reduced serum prolactin is associated with various reproductive problems in cattle, and especially in horses, including agalactia and poor conception, and late-term losses of foals and sometimes mares due to dystocia and thickened placentas. The adrenergic blockage by ergopeptines (e.g., ergovaline or ergotamine) leads to potent and long-term vasoconstriction, and can result in reduced blood flow resulting in intense burning pain (St. Anthony's fire), edema, cyanosis, dry gangrene and even loss of hooves in cattle or limbs in humans.

Although both gangrenous and convulsive symptoms are seen in naturally occurring ergotism resulting from the ingestion of fungus infected rye, only gangrenous ergotism has been reported following the excessive ingestion of ergotamine tartrate.

Ergot extract has been used in pharmaceutical preparations, including ergot alkaloids in products such as Cafergot (containing caffeine and ergotamine or ergoline) to treat migraine headaches, and ergometrine, used to induce uterine contractions and to control bleeding after childbirth. Clinical ergotism as seen today results almost exclusively from the excessive intake of ergotamine tartrate in the treatment of migraine headache.

In addition to ergot alkaloids, Claviceps paspali also produces tremorgens (paspalitrem) causing "paspalum staggers" in cattle. The fungi of the genera Penicillium and Aspergillus also produce ergot alkaloids, notably some isolates of the human pathogen Aspergillus fumigatus, and have been isolated from plants in the family Convolvulaceae, of which morning glory is best known. The causative agents of most ergot poisonings are the ergot alkaloid class of fungal metabolites, though some ergot fungi produce distantly related indole-diterpene alkaloids that are tremorgenic.

Ergot does not contain lysergic acid diethylamide (LSD) but instead contains lysergic acid as well as its precursor, ergotamine. Lysergic acid is a precursor for the synthesis of LSD. Their realized and hypothesized medicinal uses have encouraged intensive research since the 1950s culminating on the one hand in development of drugs both legal (e.g., bromocriptine) and illegal (e.g., LSD), and on the other hand in extensive knowledge of the enzymes, genetics and diversity of ergot alkaloid biosynthetic pathways.

The January 4, 2007 issue of the New England Journal of Medicine includes a paper that documents a British study of more than 11,000 Parkinson's disease patients. The study found that two ergot-derived drugs, pergolide and cabergoline, commonly used to treat Parkinson's Disease may increase the risk of leaky heart valves by up to 700%.

== Economic impact ==
Ergot contamination of crops continues to have economic consequences. In the European Union, ergot in grains made for human consumption can only have 0.05% of ergot in grains and up to a maximum and selling grains with a higher percentage than that would result in fines and fees. Similar standards are held for the US and Canada. Additional costs also arise from the cleaning of grains containing ergot with it being estimated to be 2€/dt. Average contamination levels in Germany between 1995 and 2004 were relatively stable with it being at 0.11% w/w. Outbreaks have caused severe localized losses, in 1998 there was almost a total loss of rye crops in Germany. In 2005, in the US Midwest there was also a widespread amount of ergot that was reported to be found in barley crops. To reduce the risk of ergot infection found in grains, farmers have to introduce different methods such as changes in crop rotation and deeper ploughing.

The consumption of ergot alkaloids poisons livestock, particularly grazing animals such as cows, sheep, and horses. Two different ways it could be consumed by animals are either on the tip of pasture grasses or the feed grains crops we produce to feed them. In the US, annual cow losses that are associated with tall fescue toxicosis were first seen in the 1930’s. In 1990 the estimated economic loss for the cows that were affected by this was estimated to be more than $600 million. Affected livestock have reduced weight gain, fat necrosis, reduced milk production, and reduced fertility. Another symptom that could be shown is fescue foot, which is usually seen in winter months, affected animals suffer from dry gangrene. Some of the animals, especially horses, can suffer from still-births, where foals suffer from distortions in bone structure.

== History ==
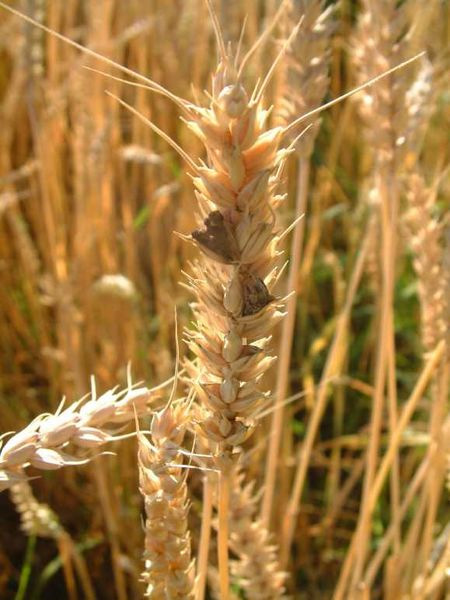
Ergot on wheat heads

Ergotism is the earliest recorded example of mycotoxicosis, or poisoning caused by toxic molds. Early references to ergotism date back as far as 600 BC, an Assyrian tablet referred to it as a "noxious pustule in the ear of grain." In 350 BC, the Parsees described "noxious grasses that cause pregnant women to drop the womb and die in childbed." In ancient Syria, ergot was called "Daughter of Blood". Radulf Glaber described an ailment he called "hidden fire", or ignus ocultus, in which a burning of the limb is followed by its separation from the body, often consuming the victim in one night. In 1588, Johannes Thallius wrote that it is called "Mother of Rye", or rockenmutter, and is used to halt bleeding.

Human poisoning due to the consumption of rye bread made from ergot-infected grain was common in Europe in the Middle Ages. The first mention of a plague of gangrenous ergotism in Europe comes from Germany in 857; following this, France and Scandinavia experienced similar outbreaks; England is noticeably absent from the historical regions affected by ergotism as its main source of food was wheat, which is resistant to ergot fungi. In 994, a massive outbreak potentially attributed to ergotism caused 40,000 deaths in the regions of Aquitaine, Limousin, Périgord and Angoumois in France. In Hesse, in 1596, Wendelin Thelius was one of the first to attribute ergotism poisoning to grain. In 1778, S. Tessier, observing a huge epidemic in Sologne, France, in which more than 8,000 people died, recommended drainage of fields, compulsory cleaning of grain, and the substitution of potatoes for affected grain.

In 1722, the Russian Tsar Peter the Great was thwarted in his campaign against the Ottoman Empire as his army, traveling down the Terek steppe, was struck by ergotism and was forced to retreat in order to find edible grains. A diary entry from the time notes that as soon as people ate the poisoned bread, they became dizzy, with such strong nerve contractions that those who did not die on the first day found their hands and feet falling off, akin to frostbite. The outbreak was known as Saint Anthony's fire, or ignis sacer.

Some historical events, such as the Great Fear in France at the outset of the French Revolution, have been linked to ergot poisoning.

=== Saint Anthony's fire and the Antonites ===
Saint Anthony was a 3rd Century Egyptian ascetic who lived by the Red Sea and was known for long fasting in which he confronted terrible visions and temptations sent from the Devil. He was credited by two noblemen for assisting them in recovery from the disease; they subsequently founded the Order of St. Anthony in his honor. Anthony was a popular subject for art in the Middle Ages, and his symbol is a large blue "T" sewn onto the shoulder of the order's monks, symbolizing the crutch used by the ill and injured.

The Order of St. Anthony, whose members were known as Antonites, grew quickly, and hospitals spread through France, Germany and Scandinavia and gained wealth and power as grateful patrons bestowed money and charitable goods on the hospitals. By the end of the Middle Ages, there were 396 settlements and 372 hospitals owned by the order, and pilgrimages to such hospitals became popular, as well as the donation of limbs lost to ergotism, which were displayed near shrines to the saint. These hagiotherapeutic centers were the first specialized European medical welfare systems, and the friars of the order were knowledgeable about treatment of ergotism and the horrifying effects of the poison. The sufferers would receive ergot-free meals, wines containing vasodilating and analgesic herbs, and applications of Antonites-balsam, which was the first transdermal therapeutic system (TTS) in medical history. These medical recipes have been lost to time, though some recorded treatments still remain. After 1130, the monks were no longer permitted to perform operations, and so barber surgeons were employed to remove gangrenous limbs and treat open sores. Three barbers founded a hospital in Memmingen in 1214 and accepted those who were afflicted with the gangrenous form of ergotism. Patients were fed and housed, with the more able-bodied individuals acting as orderlies and assistants. Patients with the convulsive form of ergotism, or ergotismus convulsivus, were welcomed for only nine days before they were asked to leave, as convulsive ergotism was seen as less detrimental. Though the sufferers often experienced irreversible effects, they most often returned to their families and resumed their livelihoods.

An important aspect to the Order of St. Anthony's treatment practices was the exclusion of rye bread and other ergot-containing edibles, which halted the progression of ergotism. There was no known cure for ergotism itself; however, there was treatment of the symptoms, which often included blood constriction, nervous disorders and/or hallucinations; if the sufferers survived the initial poisoning, their limbs would often fall off, and they would continue to improve in health if they halted consumption of ergot. The trunk of the body remained relatively untouched by the disease until its final stages, and the victims, not understanding the cause of their ailment, would continue to imbibe ergot-laden food for weeks until the condition reached their digestive system. It is believed that the peasantry and children were most susceptible to ergotism, though the wealthy were afflicted as well, as, at times, entire villages relied on tainted crops for sustenance, and during times of famine, ergotism reached into every house. Ergot fungus is impervious to heat and water, and thus it was most often baked into bread through rye flour; though other grasses can be infected, it was uncommon in Medieval Europe to consume grasses other than rye. The physiological effects of ergot depended on the concentration and combinations of the ingested ergot metabolites, as well as the age and nutritional status of the afflicted individual. The Antonites began to decline after physicians discovered the genesis of ergotism and recommended methods for removing the sclerotium from the rye crops. In 1776, the cloisters of the Antonites were incorporated into the Maltese Knights Hospitaller, losing much of their medical histories in the process and losing the ergotism cures and recipes due to lack of use and lack of preservation.

=== Usage in gynaecology and obstetrics ===
Midwives and very few doctors in Europe have used extracts from ergot for centuries:

1. In a Nuremberg manuscript of 1474, powdered ergot was prescribed together with Laurel-fruits and rhizomes of Solomon's seals to cure permutter or heffmutter, which refers to pain in the lower abdomen caused by 'uprising of the womb'
2. In a printed book of 1582, the German physician Adam Lonicer wrote, that three sclerotia of ergot, used several times a day, were used by midwives as a good remedy in case of the "uprising and pain of the womb" (auffſteigen vnd wehethumb der mutter)
3. Joachim Camerarius the Younger wrote in 1586, that sclerotia of ergot held under the tongue, would stop bleeding

To prove that ergot is a harmless sort of grain, in 1774, the French pharmacist Antoine-Augustin Parmentier edited a letter he had received from Madame Dupile, a midwife of Chaumont-en-Vexin. She had told him that if uterine contractions were too weak in the expulsion stage of childbirth, she and her mother gave peeled ergot in an amount of the filling of a thimble dispersed in water, wine or broth. The administration of ergot was followed by a mild childbirth within 15 minutes. The French physician Jean-Baptiste Desgranges (1751–1831) published in 1818, that in 1777 he had met midwives in Lyon, who successfully treated feeble uterine contractions by administering the powder of ergot. Desgranges added this remedy to his therapeutic arsenal. From 1777 to 1804, he was successful in alleviating childbirth for more than twenty women by the administration of the powder of ergot. He never saw any side-effect of this treatment.

In the United States, in 1807 Dr. John Stearns of Saratoga County, New York wrote to a friend that he had used, over several years, a pulvis parturiens with complete success in patients with "lingering parturitation". This pulvis parturiens consisted of ergot, that he called a "spurious groth of rye". He boiled "half a drachm" (ca. 2g) of that powder in half a pint of water and gave one third every twenty minutes, till the pains commenced. In 1813, Dr. Oliver Prescott (1762–1827) of Newburyport, Massachusetts published a dissertation "on the natural history and medical effects of the secale cornutum", in which he described and analysed the experience he had gathered over five years while using ergot in cases of poor uterine action in the second stage of labour in childbirth.

The 1836 Dispensatory of the United States recommended "to a woman in labour fifteen or twenty grains [ca. 1 to 1.3g] of ergot in powder to be repeated every twenty minutes, till its peculiar effects are experienced, or till the amount of a drachm [ca. 3.9g] has been taken".

In 1837, the French Codex Pharmacopee Francaise required ergot to be kept in all pharmacies.

Low to very low evidence from clinical trials suggests that prophylactic use of ergot alkaloids, administered by intravenous (IV) or intramuscular (IM) in the third stage of labor, may reduce blood loss and may reduce the risk of moderate to severe hemorrhage following delivery, however this medication may also be associated with higher blood pressure and higher pain. It is not clear if oral ergot alkaloids are beneficial or harmful as they have not been well studied. A 2018 Cochrane Systematic Review concluded that other medications such as oxytocin, syntometrine and prostaglandins, may be preferred over ergot alkaloids.

Though ergot was known to cause abortions in cattle and humans, this was not a recognized use for it as abortion was illegal in most countries, thus evidence for its use in abortion is unknown. Most often, ergot was used to speed the process of parturition or delivery, and was not used for the purpose of halting postpartum bleeding, which is a concern of childbirth. However, until anesthesia became available, there was no antidote or way of controlling the effects of ergot. So if the fetus did not move as expected, the drug could cause the uterus to mold itself around the child, rupturing the uterus and killing the child. David Hosack, an American physician, noted the large number of stillbirths resulting from ergot use and stated that rather than pulvis ad partum, it should be called pulvis ad mortem. He began advocating for its use to halt postpartum bleeding. Eventually, doctors determined that the use of ergot in childbirth without an antidote was too dangerous. They ultimately restricted its use to expelling the placenta or stopping hemorrhage. Not only did it constrict the uterus, ergot had the ability to increase or decrease blood pressure, induce hypothermia and emesis, and influence pituitary hormone secretions. In 1926, Swiss psychiatrist Hans Maier suggested to use ergotamine for the treatment of vascular headaches of the migraine type.

In the 1930s, abortifacient drugs were marketed to women by various companies under various names such as Molex pills and Cote pills. Since birth control devices and abortifacients were illegal to market and sell at the time, they were offered to women who were "delayed". The recommended dosage was seven grains of ergotin a day. According to the United States Federal Trade Commission (FTC) these pills contained ergotin, aloes, Black Hellebore and other substances. The efficacy and safety of these pills are unknown. The FTC deemed them unsafe and ineffective and demanded that they cease and desist selling the product. Currently, over a thousand compounds have been derived from ergot ingredients.

=== Speculated cause of hysterics and hallucinations ===
It has been posited that Kykeon, the beverage consumed by participants in the ancient Greek Eleusinian Mysteries cult, might have been based on hallucinogens from ergotamine, a precursor to the potent hallucinogen LSD, and ergonovine.

An article appearing in the July 23, 1881 edition of Scientific American entitled "A New Exhilarating Substance" denotes cases of euphoria upon consuming tincture of ergot of rye, particularly when mixed with phosphate of soda and sweetened water. In rainy years, it was thought rye bread exceeded 5% ergot.

British author John Grigsby contends that the presence of ergot in the stomachs of some of the so-called 'bog-bodies' (Iron Age human remains from peat bogs of northeast Europe, such as the Tollund Man) is indicative of use of Claviceps purpurea in ritual drinks in a prehistoric fertility cult akin to the Greek Eleusinian Mysteries. In his 2005 book Beowulf and Grendel, he argues that the Anglo-Saxon poem Beowulf is based on a memory of the quelling of this fertility cult by followers of Odin. He writes that Beowulf, which he translates as barley-wolf, suggests a connection to ergot which in German was known as the 'tooth of the wolf'.

Linnda R. Caporael posited in 1976 that the hysterical symptoms of young women that had spurred the Salem witch trials had been the result of consuming ergot-tainted rye. However, Nicholas P. Spanos and Jack Gottlieb, after a review of the historical and medical evidence, later disputed her conclusions. Other authors have likewise cast doubt on ergotism as the cause of the Salem witch trials.

== Claviceps purpurea ==
Mankind has known about Claviceps purpurea for a long time, and its appearance has been linked to extremely cold winters that were followed by rainy summers.

The sclerotial stage of C. purpurea conspicuous on the heads of ryes and other such grains is known as ergot. Favorable temperatures for growth are in the range of 18–30 °C. Temperatures above 37 °C cause rapid germination of conidia. Sunlight has a chromogenic effect on the mycelium, with intense coloration. Cereal mashes and sprouted rye are suitable substrates for growth of the fungus in the laboratory.

== Claviceps africana ==
Claviceps africana infects sorghum. In sorghum and pearl millet, ergot became a problem when growers adopted hybrid technology, which increased host susceptibility. It only infects unfertilized ovaries, so self-pollination and fertilization can decrease the presence of the disease, but male-sterile lines are extremely vulnerable to infection. Symptoms of infection by C. africana include the secretion of honeydew (a fluid with high concentrates of sugar and conidia), which attracts insects like flies, beetles and wasps that feed on it. This helps spread the fungus to uninfected plants.

In Sorghum, this honeydew can be spotted coming out of head flowers. A whitish sticky substance can also be observed on leaves and on the ground.

C. africana caused ergot disease that caused a famine in 1903–1906 in northern Cameroon, West Africa, and also occurs in eastern and southern Africa, especially Zimbabwe and South Africa. Male sterile sorghums (also referred to as A-lines) are especially susceptible to infection, as first recognized in the 1960s, and massive losses in seed yield have been noted. Infection is associated with cold night temperatures that are below 12 °C occurring two to three weeks before flowering.

Sorghum ergot caused by Claviceps africana Frederickson, Mantle and De Milliano is widespread in all sorghum-growing areas, whereas the species was formerly restricted to Africa and Asia where it was first recorded more than 90 years ago, it has been spreading rapidly and by the mid-1990s it reached Brazil, South Africa and Australia. By 1997, the disease had spread to most South American countries and the Caribbean including Mexico, and by 1997 had reached Texas in the United States.

=== Management ===
Partners of the CABI-led programme, Plantwise (including the Ministry of Agriculture and Livestock in Zambia) have several recommendations for managing the spread of ergot, these include; planting tolerant varieties, disk fields after harvest to prevent sorghum ratoon and volunteer plants from developing, remove any infected plants, and carrying out three-year crop rotations with legumes.

== In media ==
In the Bones episode "The Witch in the Wardrobe" (Season 5, Episode 20), ergot is identified as the underlying cause behind the death of a witch, Zephrya, at the hands of a coven. Ergot-contaminated rye flour induced hallucinations in the coven, resulting in Zephrya's murder.

In The Apothecary Diaries episode "Let Them Eat Cake" (Season 3, Episode 3), the titular apothecary Maomao treats a beggar girl suffering from ergotism. Maomao identifies the source of the ergot as a sugary snack distributed to the residents of the slums.

The song "Ergot" by Big Black from their 1987 album Songs About Fucking is about the hallucinogenic effect of the fungi.

== See also ==
- Medicinal uses of fungi
- Dassel History Center & Ergot Museum: a major producer of ergot

== Sources ==
This article incorporates text from a free content work. Licensed under CC-BY-SA (license statement/permission). Text taken from PMDG: Ergot sugary disease in sorghum, CABI.
