= Elizabeth Monk =

Canadian lawyer

Elizabeth Carmichael Monk QC
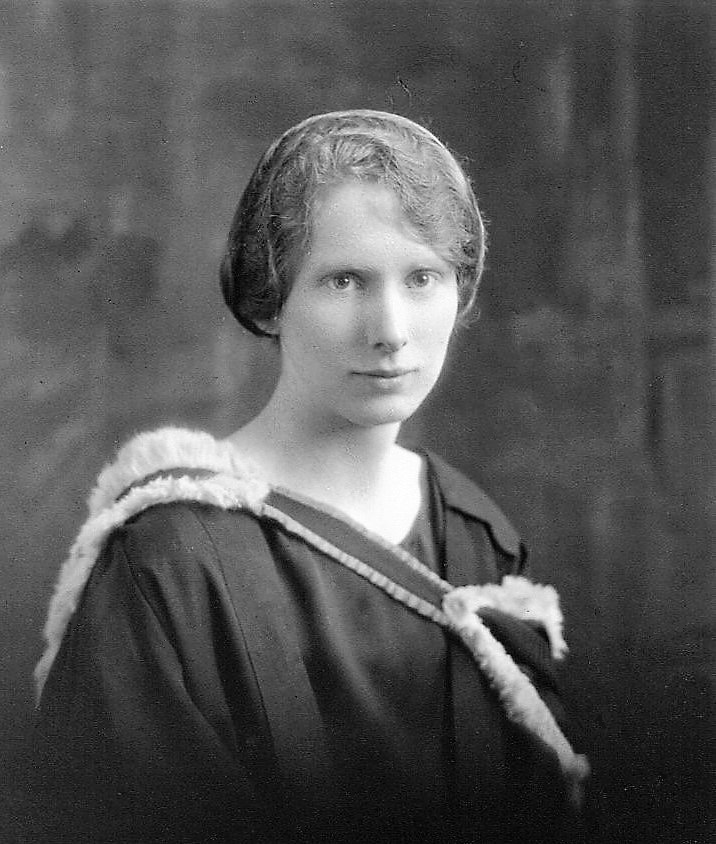
- Born: August 4, 1898; Montreal, Quebec, Canada
- Died: December 26, 1980 (aged 82); Montreal, Quebec, Canada
- Education: McGill University
- Occupation: lawyer

Elizabeth Carmichael Monk (August 4, 1898 – December 26, 1980) was a Canadian lawyer and Montreal city councillor. In 1942, she became one of the first two women admitted to the Quebec Bar, alongside Suzanne Raymond Filion. In 1980, she was one of five recipients of the Governor General's Award in Commemoration of the Persons Case.

== Early life and education ==
Monk was born in Montreal on August 4, 1898, to Alfred Monk, a lawyer, and Mary Elizabeth Monk. She studied at Montreal's High School for Girls. A Governor General's gold medallist, she graduated from McGill University in 1919 with a Bachelor of Arts degree in modern languages and won a scholarship to Radcliffe College, where she graduated with a Master of Arts. She won the IODE overseas post-graduate scholarship for the province of Quebec and proceeded to study at Somerville College in Oxford. She went on to study civil law at McGill University, where she obtained her bachelor's degree in 1923 and received the Elizabeth Torrance Medal, the first woman to receive this award.

== Career ==
=== Early career and activism ===
Despite her academic achievements, Monk could not write the bar exam as Quebec did not allow women to be admitted to the Quebec Bar at the time. Instead, she worked as a researcher for a law firm. In 1934, she travelled to Nova Scotia to sit for the bar exam in that province. Monk continued her work in Montreal, even though she was not recognized as a lawyer.

Throughout her early career, Monk was actively involved in various women's rights organizations. In 1927, Monk co-founded the University Women's Club of Montreal and served as its president from 1932 to 1938. She also served six years as the treasurer of the Canadian Federation of University Women and acted as legal counsel for the League for Women's Rights. Through her work with the League for Women's Rights, she submitted a brief to the Rowell–Sirois Commission (1937-1938) on federal-provincial relations. In her report, she highlighted many of the injustices faced by women, which she attributed to their exclusion from provincial politics. At the time, women could not vote or run for public office in Quebec, which made them ineligible for federal positions, even though they were subject to the same civic duties as men such as paying taxes. She concluded her report by calling on the Canadian government to include a declaration in the Constitution that explicitly condemned discrimination on the basis of gender and ethnicity.

=== Montreal city council ===
In 1940, Monk became one of the first women to sit on the Montreal City Council as a delegate of the Montreal Citizens Committee. An amendment to the Cities and Towns Act the following year extended suffrage to all women at the municipal level and granted them the right to run for office in municipal elections.

=== Admission to Quebec Bar ===
In January 1941, Monk, along with two other women – Annie Langstaff and Leslie Bell – submitted a plea to the General Council of the Quebec Bar Association, urging them to grant women admission to the Quebec Bar. The entry of women had been a contentious matter within Quebec's legal community and was met with “what was in some instances almost violent opposition on the part of the members of the Bar.” In March, the council voted – by a narrow margin of 12 votes in favour to 11 votes against – to call on the Quebec Legislature to pass enabling legislation. The measure passed on April 29 and women were finally granted admission to the Quebec Bar.

On January 13, 1942, Elizabeth Monk became one of the first two women admitted to the Quebec Bar, alongside Suzanne Raymond Filion, nearly 20 years after she had received her law degree. At the time, however, one of Monk's colleagues from Vallée Viens Beaudry & Fortier was representing a client in a lawsuit against the city. Under a clause in Montreal's city charter, a lawyer became ineligible to sit as a city councillor when they were involved in a legal case against the city and Monk was forced to leave her post as city councillor.

== Later life and death ==
Monk continued to practice law up until just a few months before her death and specialized primarily in commercial and real estate law. She continued to advocate for the advancement of women, both within the legal community and Quebec society in general. She died in Montreal on December 26, 1980.

== Awards and recognition ==
In 1955, Monk became the first Quebec woman to receive a Queen's Counsel designation.

In 1975, Monk received an honorary doctorate in law from McGill University.

In 1980, Monk was one of five recipients of the Governor General's Award in Commemoration of the Persons Case.

In 2019, Monk was designated an historic personage by Nathalie Roy, Quebec's Minister of Culture and Communications.
