= Claviceps sorghi =

Scientific classification
- Kingdom: Fungi
- Division: Ascomycota
- Class: Sordariomycetes
- Order: Hypocreales
- Family: Clavicipitaceae
- Genus: Claviceps
- Species: C. sorghi

Binomial name
- Claviceps sorghi B.G.P. Kulk., (1976)

Synonyms
- Sphacelia sorghi McRae, (1917)

Species of fungus

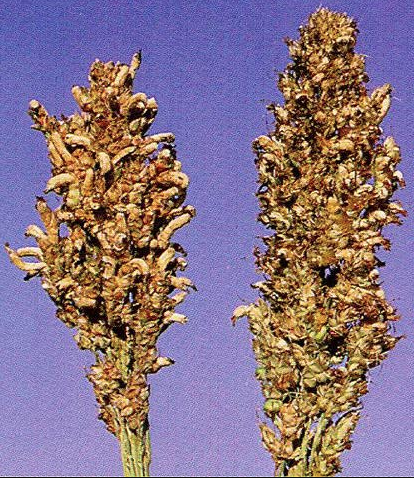
Fig. 5 Full blown infection of Sorghum plant by C. sorghi

Claviceps sorghi is a fungal plant pathogen belonging to the phylum Ascomycota in the kingdom Fungi- its anamorphic phase is known as Sphacelia sorghi. This species was first found in In India in 1915 and officially recorded in 1948 . The genus Claviceps is known for infection of cereal and millet crops. This particular species of Claviceps infects sorghum - giving the fungus its name 'sorghi'. These species in Claviceps are known to produce ergot on their host, as a byproduct of their infection. This can cause the disease known as ergotism when the infected crop is consumed.

== Life cycle ==
The complete life cycle of C. sorghi can be seen in Fig. 3. C. sorghi begins its infection of Sorghum via the germination of its macroconidium on the stigma of male-sterile plants prior to pollination of their ovaries. The germinating macroconidium develops a germ tube in order to penetrate the surface of the plant and send hyphae through the plant in order to reach and infect the plant's ovary. Once the ovary has been colonized, C. sorghi incubates for 8–10 days while it consumes the ovary with hyphae. This inoculation of the ovary produces a sphacelium- a white hyphal mass in place of the ovary, which will release C. sorghi's conidium in a honeydew like substance. These conidium have limited dispersal and rely on the wind and insects for transmission to other host plants. These sphacelium exist alongside the sexual stage of the Claviceps species - the sclerotium. The floret, containing both the sphacelium and sclerotium, will eventually produce the elongated sclerotium seen in Fig. 1. These sclerotium, once germinated, will produce perithecium allowing for primary infection of another sorghum plant. This will result in the restarting of the infection cycle- infecting new ovaries which will then produce additional sphacelium and sclerotium.

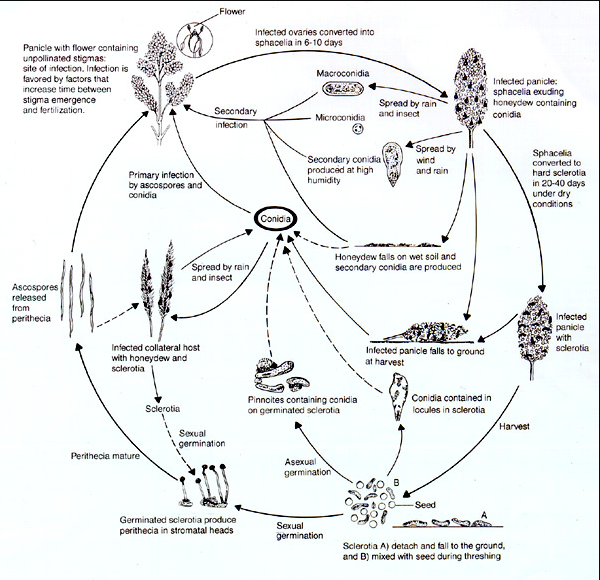
Fig. 3 The life cycle of sorghum ergot.

== Geographic distribution ==
Claviceps sorghi is endemic to India with possible specimens found in southeastern Asia although not confirmed. Sorghum ergot is found in globally, and was thought to be due to instances of C. sorghi infection. This infection was determined to be a distinctly separate pathogen Claviceps africana which is responsible for the majority of sorghum ergot. This distinction in 1991 was made by identifying distinctly different sclerotium between the infections in Africa, and the infections found in India. C. africana is responsible for global infections of sorghum ergot, while C. sorghi is endemic to Southeast Asia and India. C. africana has also been found in India, and has been hypothesized to have marginalized the endemic populations of C. sorghi.

=== Environmental conditions ===
The sexual and asexual cycles are encouraged by differential environmental conditions. Relative humidity over 60% encourages the formation of the conidium containing honeydew produced by the sphacelium. Dryer conditions encourage the formation of sclerotium these environmental conditions occur in the fall, encouraging the formation of the overwintering structures. However, optimal temperatures for spore production and sclerotium formation were similar. Sclerotium's optimal temperature for maturation was found to be 27 degrees Celsius whereas spore formation experienced optimal conditions at 24–28 degrees Celsius. Due to the high temperatures and high humidity needed for optimal proliferation of C. sorghi, it remains endemic to India and the surrounding areas which have high temperatures year round, as well as monsoon season which provides the humid conditions which encourage conidium formation.

== Distinguishing features of C. sorghi ==
=== Macroscopic features ===
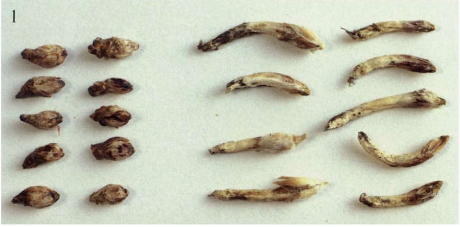
Fig. 1 Sorghum ergot Sclerotium (sexual reproductive structure) of C. africana (left) and C. sorghi (right)

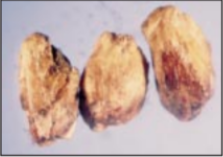
Fig. 4 The asexual reproductive structure of sorghum ergot.

Sclerotium of C. sorghi (Fig. 1) is much more elongated than other species of sclerotium which also infect sorghum. C. sorgi produce 2–3 stomata per sclerotium. The sclerotium are especially important to the proliferation of C. sorghi as they remain viable to infect after being dormant for up to 10 years. Compare Fig. 1- the sexual structure of sorghum ergot to Fig 4. – the asexual structure of sorghum ergot responsible for producing conidium known as sphacelium.

=== Microscopic features ===
Macroconidium of C. sorghi are distinct from those of C. africana due to their elongated appearance when compared under a microscope. Macroconidium of C. sorghi (Fig. 2) are described as hyaline, oblong to oval, with a vacuole at each end measuring around 9-17 x 5-8 um.

== Management ==
There is currently no source of resistance for Sorghum bicolor that has viability against C. sorghi. There has been success in reducing C. sorghi abundance by sowing fields early in the season, and planting sorghum in conditions less favorable to C. sorghi, in India, this time was found to be the first two weeks of June. Rotating crops to prevent infection from overwintering sclerotium as well as the removal of infected sorghum from the crop at harvest has also been shown to reduce instances of C. sorghi infection.

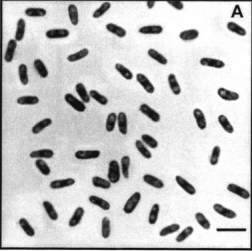
Fig. 2 Macroconidium of C. Sorghi
