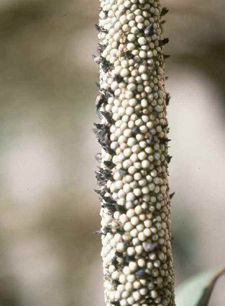

Scientific classification
- Domain: Eukaryota
- Kingdom: Fungi
- Division: Ascomycota
- Class: Sordariomycetes
- Order: Hypocreales
- Family: Clavicipitaceae
- Genus: Claviceps
- Species: C. fusiformis

Binomial name
- Claviceps fusiformis Loveless, (1967)

= Claviceps fusiformis =

Species of fungus

Claviceps fusiformis is a plant pathogen.
