= Claviceps pusilla =

Scientific classification
- Kingdom: Fungi
- Division: Ascomycota
- Class: Sordariomycetes
- Order: Hypocreales
- Family: Clavicipitaceae
- Genus: Claviceps
- Species: C. pusilla

Binomial name
- Claviceps pusilla Ces.

Species of fungus

Claviceps pusilla, also known as bluestem ergot, is a parasitic fungus primarily of the grass tribe Angropogoneae, particularly those in the tribe referred to as "bluestem". C. pusilla occasionally manifests characteristic triangular conidia which appear to be unique among Claviceps species.

== Range ==
Claviceps pusilla has been documented in Australia, and in the US in the states of Texas, New Mexico, Oklahoma, and Iowa.

The earliest record found for C. pusilla was by Pammel and Weems in 1900. Scientists have identified C. pusilla on Andropogon species based on examination of ascomata from germinated sclerotia. Examination of a collection from Texas revealed yellow capitula characteristic of C. pusilla. However, in certain collections labeled as C. pusilla, triangular conidia characteristic of this species were not present. Additional collections need to be examined to confirm the presence of C. pusilla in the United States. C. pusilla has a wide geographical distribution, is known from Andropogon spp., and likely occurs on Andropogon spp. in the United States. However, we consider reports of C. purpurea var. purpurea on Andropogon spp. to be incorrect.

== Ecology ==
Claviceps pusilla infects the inflorescence of certain grasses by replacing caryopses with fungal sclerotia.

List of published host species:

- Andropogon gerardii Vitman = Andropogon furcatus Muhl. in Wild.
- Andropogon hallii Hack.
- Andropogon spp.
- Arundinella nepalensis
- Bothriochloa biloba
- Bothriochloa bladhii
- Bothriochloa decipiens
- Bothriochloa erianthoides
- Bothriochloa ewartiana
- Bothriochloa glabra
- Bothriochloa insculpta
- Bothriochloa ischaemum (L.) Keng = Andropogon ischaemum L.
- Bothriochloa macra
- Bothriochloa pertusa
- Capillipedium spicigerum
- Chrysopogon filipes
- Cymbopogon refractus
- Dichanthium annulatum
- Dichanthium aristatum
- Dichanthium caricosum
- Dichanthium sericeum
- Heteropogon contortus
- Hyparrhenia hirta
- Pennisetum glaucum
- Sarga leiocladum
- Sarga plumosum
- Schizachyrium scoparium (Michx.) Nash = Andropogon scoparius Michx.
- Themeda triandra
- Urochloa sp.

== Taxonomy ==
A synonym for Claviceps pusilla Ces. is Hypocrea pusilla Ces..
