= Hagiotherapy =

Practice of using religious practices to alleviate sickness

Hagiotherapy is the medieval practice of using religious relics, prayers, pilgrimages, etc. to alleviate sickness. It was used to treat epilepsy during the Middle Ages with Saint Valentine particularly associated with the treatment as an 'epilepsy specialist'.
